= Esarhaddon =

King of the Neo-Assyrian Empire, 681–669 BC

- King of Assyria; King of Babylon; King of Sumer and Akkad; King of the kings of Egypt and Kush; King of the Four Corners; King of the Universe
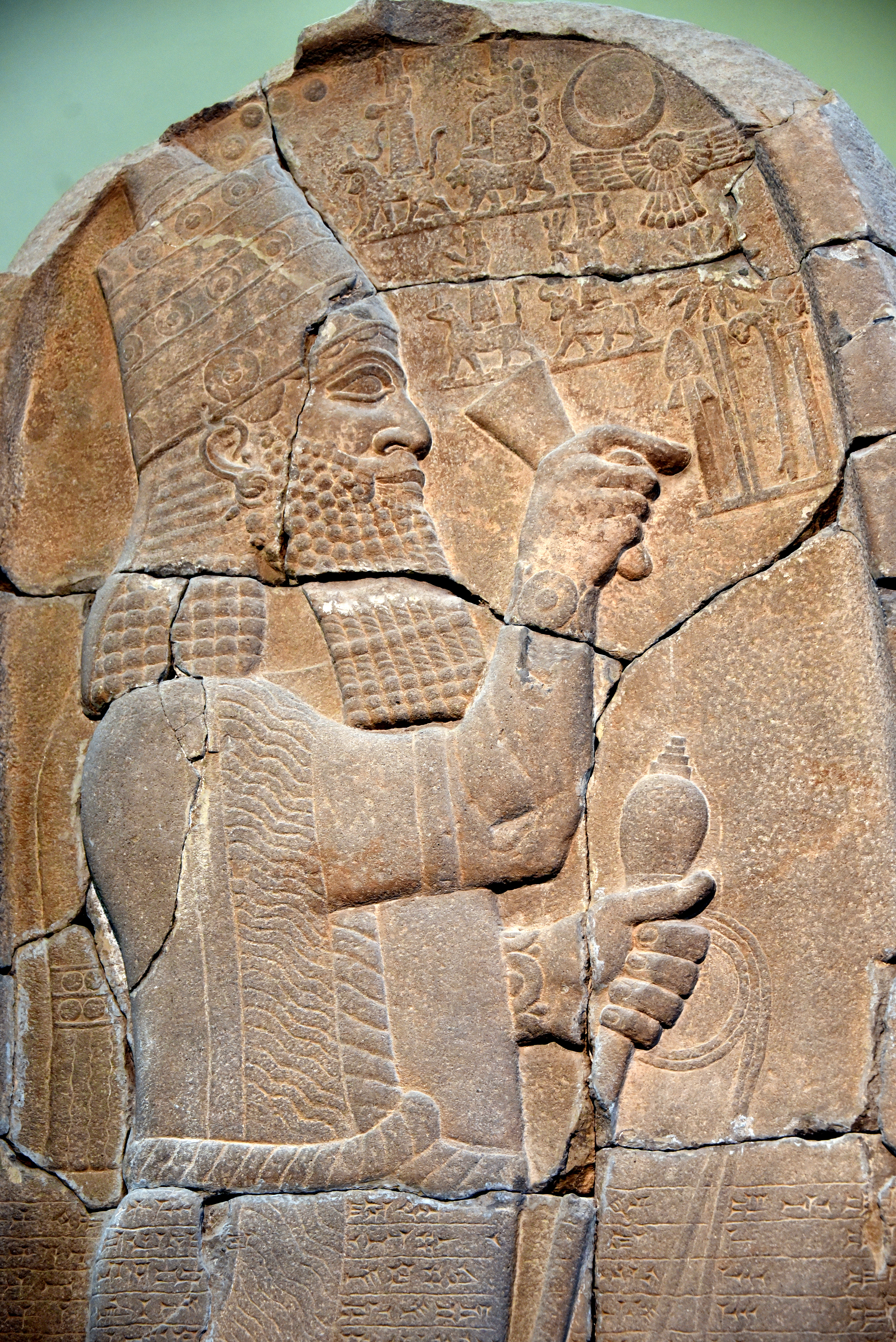
- Esarhaddon, closeup from his victory stele, now housed in the Pergamon Museum

King of the Neo-Assyrian Empire
- Reign: 12 regnal years 681 BC (accession); 680–669 BC (reign)
- Predecessor: Sennacherib
- Successor: Ashurbanipal (King of Assyria); Šamaš-šuma-ukin (King of Babylon)
- Born: c. 713 BC
- Died: 1 November 669 BC; Harran (now Şanlıurfa, Turkey)
- Spouse: Ešarra-ḫammat; Other wives
- Issue Among others: Šērūʾa-ēṭirat; Ashurbanipal; Šamaš-šuma-ukin
- Akkadian: Aššur-aḫa-iddina; Aššur-etel-ilani-mukinni (Note: Aššur-etel-ilani-mukinni was a more formal "court name" of Esarhaddon. It would only have been used by those at the royal court. It translates to "Ashur, the lord of the gods, has established me".)
- Dynasty: Sargonid dynasty
- Father: Sennacherib
- Mother: Naqiʾa

Esarhaddon, also spelled Essarhaddon, Assarhaddon and Ashurhaddon (Neo-Assyrian Akkadian: 𒀭𒊹𒉽𒀸, also 𒀭𒊹𒉽𒋧𒈾 Aššur-aḫa-iddina, meaning "Ashur has given me a brother"; Biblical Hebrew: אֵסַר־חַדֹּן ʾĒsar-Ḥaddōn) was the king of the Neo-Assyrian Empire from 681 to 669 BC. The third king of the Sargonid dynasty, Esarhaddon is most famous for his conquest of Egypt in 671 BC, which made his empire the largest the world had ever seen, and for his reconstruction of Babylon, which had been destroyed by his father.

After Sennacherib's eldest son and heir Aššur-nādin-šumi had been captured and presumably executed in 694, the new heir had originally been the second eldest son, Arda-Mulissu, but in 684, Esarhaddon, a younger son, was appointed instead. Angered by this decision, Arda-Mulissu and another brother, Nabû-šarru-uṣur, murdered their father in 681 and planned to seize the Neo-Assyrian throne. (Note: The overwhelming majority of scholars accept Arda-Mulissu's guilt as a matter of fact. Other hypotheses have at times been proposed, such as that the crime was committed by some unknown Babylonian sympathizer or even by Esarhaddon himself. In 2020, Andrew Knapp suggested that Esarhaddon might actually have been behind the murder, citing inconsistencies in the account of Arda-Mulissu's guilt, that Esarhaddon might also have had a difficult relationship with Sennacherib, the speed at which Esarhaddon assembled an army and defeated his brothers, and other circumstantial evidence.) The murder, and Arda-Mulissu's aspirations of becoming king himself, made Esarhaddon's rise to the throne difficult, and he first had to defeat his brothers in a six-week-long civil war.

His brothers' attempted coup had been unexpected and troublesome for Esarhaddon, and he would be plagued by paranoia and mistrust for his officials, governors and male family members until the end of his reign. As a result of this paranoia, most of the palaces used by Esarhaddon were high-security fortifications located outside of the major population centers of the cities. Also perhaps resulting from his mistrust for his male relatives, Esarhaddon's female relatives, such as his mother Naqiʾa and his daughter Šērūʾa-ēṭirat, were allowed to wield considerably more influence and political power during his reign than women had been allowed in any previous period of Assyrian history, with the possible exception of Sammuramat in the 9th century BC.

Despite a relatively short and difficult reign, and being plagued by paranoia, depression and constant illness, Esarhaddon remains recognized as one of the greatest and most successful Assyrian kings. He quickly defeated his brothers in 681, completed ambitious and large-scale building projects in both Assyria and Babylonia, successfully campaigned in Media, Persia, Elam, the Arabian Peninsula, Anatolia, the Caucasus, and the Levant, defeated the Kushite Empire and conquered Egypt and Libya, enforced a vassal treaty upon the Medes and Persians and ensured a peaceful transition of power to his two sons and heirs Ashurbanipal as ruler of the empire and Šamaš-šuma-ukin as king of Babylonia after his death.

== Early life ==
Sennacherib's first choice as successor had been his eldest son, Aššur-nādin-šumi, who he had appointed as the ruler of Babylon in about 700 BC. Shortly thereafter, Sennacherib attacked the land of Elam (modern day southern Iran) to defeat the Elamites and some Chaldean rebels which had fled there. In response to this attack, the Elamites invaded Babylonia from another route in the south of Sennacherib's empire and, in 694, successfully captured Ashur-nadin-shumi at the city of Sippar. The prince was taken back to Elam and probably executed, causing Sennacherib to wreak savage revenge on the Elamites, Chaldeans, and Babylonians.

=== Appointed Crown-Prince ===
After Aššur-nādin-šumi's presumed death, Sennacherib elevated his second eldest surviving son, Arda-Mulissu, as crown prince. After several years as crown prince, Arda-Mulissu was replaced as heir by Esarhaddon in 684. The reason for Arda-Mulissu's sudden dismissal from the prominent position is unknown, but it is clear that he was very disappointed. Esarhaddon described the reaction of his brothers to his appointment as heir in a later inscription:

Of my older brothers, the younger brother was I. But by decree of [the gods] Ashur and Shamash, Bel and Nabu, my father exalted me, amid a gathering of my brothers he asked Shamash, "is this my heir?" and the gods answered, "he is your second self".
And then my brothers went mad. They drew their swords, godlessly, in the middle of Nineveh. But Ashur, Shamash, Bel, Nabu, Ishtar, all the gods looked with wrath on the deeds of these scoundrels, brought their strength to weakness and humbled them beneath me.

Arda-Mulissu was forced to swear loyalty to Esarhaddon by his father, but repeatedly appealed to Sennacherib to again accept him as heir instead. These appeals were not successful, and Sennacherib came to realize that the situation was tense, so he sent Esarhaddon into exile in the western provinces for his own protection. Esarhaddon was unhappy with his exile and blamed his brothers for it, describing it with the following words:

Malicious gossip, slander and falsehood they [i.e. Esarhaddon's brothers] wove around me in a godless way, lies and insincerity. They plotted evil behind my back. Against the will of the gods, they alienated my father's well-disposed heart from me, though in secret his heart was affected with compassion, and he still intended me to exercise kingship.

== Accession ==
Around 20 October 681 BCE, the assassination of Sennacherib by princes Arda-Mulissu and Nabu-Sarru-usur led to a six-week-long war of succession before Esarhaddon could ascend the throne.

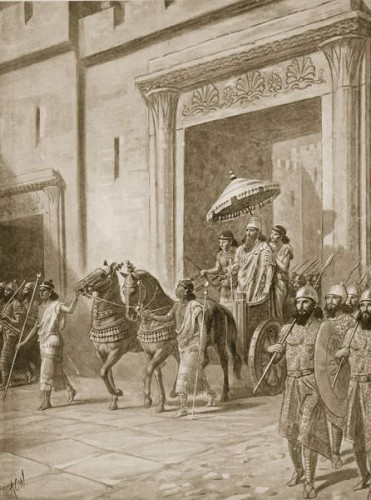
The Recognition of Esarhaddon as King in Nineveh, illustration by A. C. Weatherstone for Hutchinson's History of the Nations (1915).

Although Esarhaddon had been the crown prince of Assyria for three years and the designated heir of King Sennacherib, with the entire empire having taken oaths to support him, it was only with great difficulty that he successfully ascended the Assyrian throne.

=== War of Succession ===
Though Sennacherib had foreseen the danger of keeping Esarhaddon near his ambitious brothers, he had not foreseen the dangers to his own life. On 20 October 681, Arda-Mulissu and another of Sennacherib's sons, Nabû-šarru-uṣur, attacked and killed their father in one of Nineveh's temples. However, Arda-Mulissu's dreams of claiming the throne would be crushed. The murder of Sennacherib had caused some friction between Arda-Mulissu and his supporters, which delayed a potential coronation, and in the meantime, Esarhaddon had raised an army. With this army at his back, he met an army raised by his brothers at Hanigalbat, a region in the western parts of the empire, where most of the soldiers deserted his brothers to join him, and the enemy generals fled. He then marched on Nineveh without opposition.

Six weeks after his father's death, he was accepted and recognized as the new Assyrian king at Nineveh. Shortly after taking the throne, Esarhaddon made sure to execute all conspirators and political enemies he could get his hands on, including the families of his brothers. All servants involved with the security of the royal palace at Nineveh were "dismissed" (i.e. executed). Arda-Mulissu and Nabû-šarru-uṣur survived this purge as they had escaped as exiles to the northern kingdom of Urartu, a vassal state of the Assyrian Empire in Anatolia. The frequent mentions of Arda-Mulissu and Esarhaddon's other brothers in his inscriptions indicates that he was surprised and bothered by their actions. Esarhaddon's own inscription chronicling his entry into Nineveh and his purge of those in support of the conspiracy reads as follows:

I entered into Nineveh, my royal city, joyfully, and took my seat upon the throne of my father in safety. The south wind blew, the breath of Ea, the wind whose blowing is favourable for exercising kingship. There awaited me favourable signs in heaven and on earth, a message of the soothsayers, tidings from the gods and goddesses. Continually [missing portion] and gave my heart courage.
The soldiers, the rebels who had fomented the plot to seize the rulership of Assyria for my brothers, their ranks I examined to the last man and I laid a heavy penalty upon them, I destroyed their seed.

== Reign ==
On 1 Nisannu (Mar/Apr, 680 BCE), Esarhaddon celebrated the New Year and the start of his regnal Year 1, the formal beginning of his reign following the accession year (last year of the regnal year of Sennacherib).

=== Paranoia ===
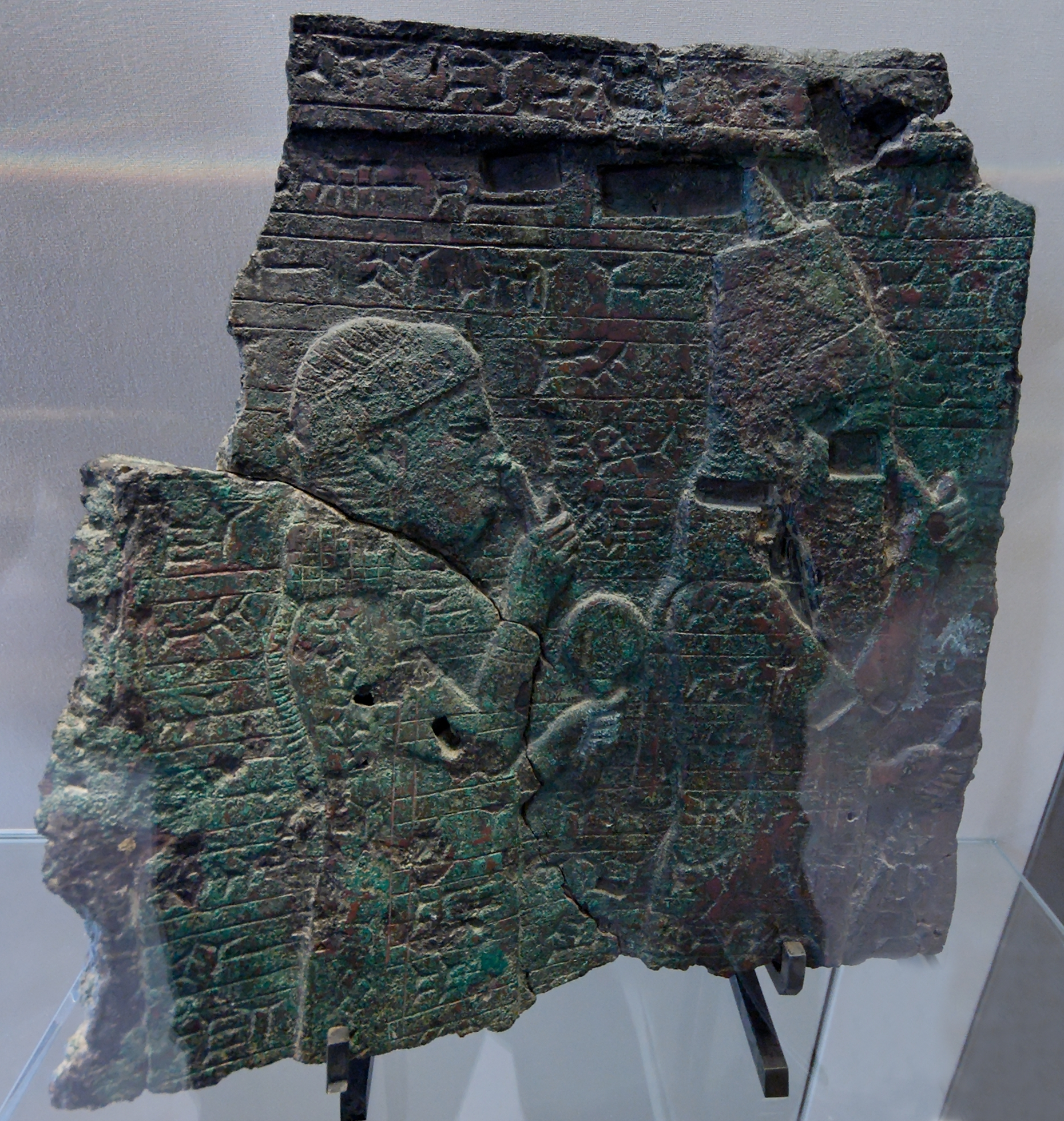
Relief in the Louvre depicting Esarhaddon (right) and his mother Naqiʾa (left). Possibly as a result of his distrust of his male relatives, the women of the royal family were allowed greater political influence and power during Esarhaddon's reign than in any previous period of Assyrian history.

As a result of his tumultuous rise to the throne, Esarhaddon was distrustful of his servants, vassals and family members. He frequently sought the advice of oracles and priests on whether any of his relatives or officials wished to harm him. Although highly distrustful of his male relatives, Esarhaddon seems to not have been paranoid in regards to his female relatives. During his reign, his wife Ešarra-ḫammat, his mother Naqiʾa and his daughter Šērūʾa-ēṭirat all wielded considerably more influence and political power than women during earlier parts of Assyrian history.

Esarhaddon's paranoia was also reflected in where he chose to live. One of his main residences was a palace in the city of Nimrud originally constructed as an armoury by his predecessor Shalmaneser III (r. 859–824 BC) almost two hundred years earlier. Rather than occupying a central and visible spot within the cultic and administrative center of the city, this palace was located on the outskirts of the city on a separate mound, which made it well-protected. Between 676 and 672, the palace was strengthened with its gateways being modified into impregnable fortifications, which could seal the entire building off completely from the city. If these entrances were sealed, the only way into the palace would be through a steep and narrow path protected by several strong doors. A similar palace, also located on a separate mound far from the city center, was built at Nineveh.

All Assyrian kings are known to have sought the guidance of the sun-god Shamash (which was obtained through interpreting what was perceived as signs from the gods) for advice in political and military matters, such as whom to appoint to a certain position or if a planned military campaign would be successful. Queries concerning the possibility of betrayal are known only from Esarhaddon's reign.

Most scholars have classified Esarhaddon as paranoid, some going as far as suggesting that he developed paranoid personality disorder after the murder of his father. Other scholars have refrained from using this label, instead simply characterizing him as "mistrustful" and noting that paranoia is "by definition delusional and irrational" while Esarhaddon is likely to have had many real opponents and enemies.

=== Reconstruction of Babylon ===
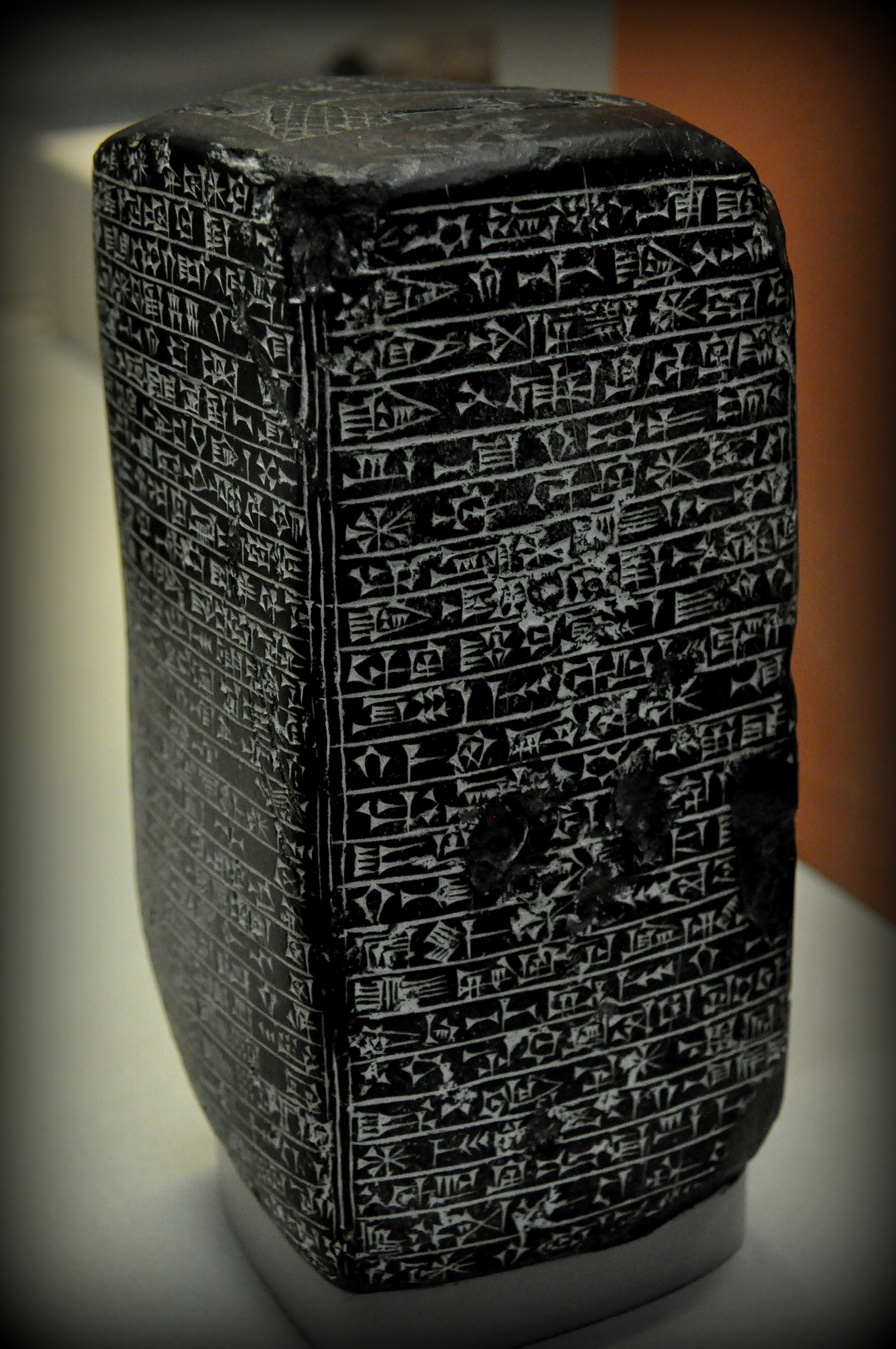
Black basalt monument of Esarhaddon in traditional Sumero-Akkadian cuneiform, which narrates his restoration of Babylon. c. 670 BC. Exhibited at the British Museum, BM 91027.

Esarhaddon wished to ensure the support of the inhabitants of Babylonia, the southern part of his empire. To this end, the king sponsored building and restoration projects throughout the south to a far greater extent than any of his predecessors had. Babylonia had only become an inner part of the Assyrian Empire relatively recently, having been ruled by native kings as vassals of the Assyrians until its conquest and annexation by the Assyrian king Tiglath-Pileser III in the previous century. Through his building program, Esarhaddon likely hoped to show the benefits of continuing Assyrian rule over the region and that he meant to rule Babylon with the same care and generosity as a native Babylonian king.

The city of Babylon, which gave its name to Babylonia, had been the political centre of southern Mesopotamia for more than a thousand years. In an effort to quell Babylonian aspirations of independence, the city had been razed by Esarhaddon's father in 689 BC, and the statue of Bel (also known as Marduk), the patron deity of the city, had been carried off deep into Assyrian territory. The restoration of the city, announced by Esarhaddon in 680, became one of his most important projects.

Throughout Esarhaddon's reign, reports from the officials the king appointed to oversee the reconstruction speak of the great scope of the building project. The ambitious restoration of the city involved removing the large amount of debris left since Sennacherib's destruction of the city; resettlement of the many Babylonians who by this point were either enslaved or scattered across the empire; the reconstruction of most of the buildings; the restoration of the great temple complex dedicated to Bel, known as the Esagila, and the enormous ziggurat complex called Etemenanki; as well as the restoration of the two inner walls of the city. The project was not only important because it illustrated goodwill towards the Babylonian people but also because it allowed Esarhaddon to assume one of the essential characteristics the Babylonians invested in kingship. While the king of Assyria was generally supposed to be a military figure, the king of Babylon was ideally a builder and restorer, particularly of temples. Careful to not associate himself with the city's destruction, he only refers to himself as a king "ordained by the gods" in his inscriptions in Babylon, only mentioning Sennacherib in his inscriptions in the north and blaming the city's destruction not on his father but on Babylon "offending its gods." Writing of his reconstruction of Babylon, Esarhaddon states the following:

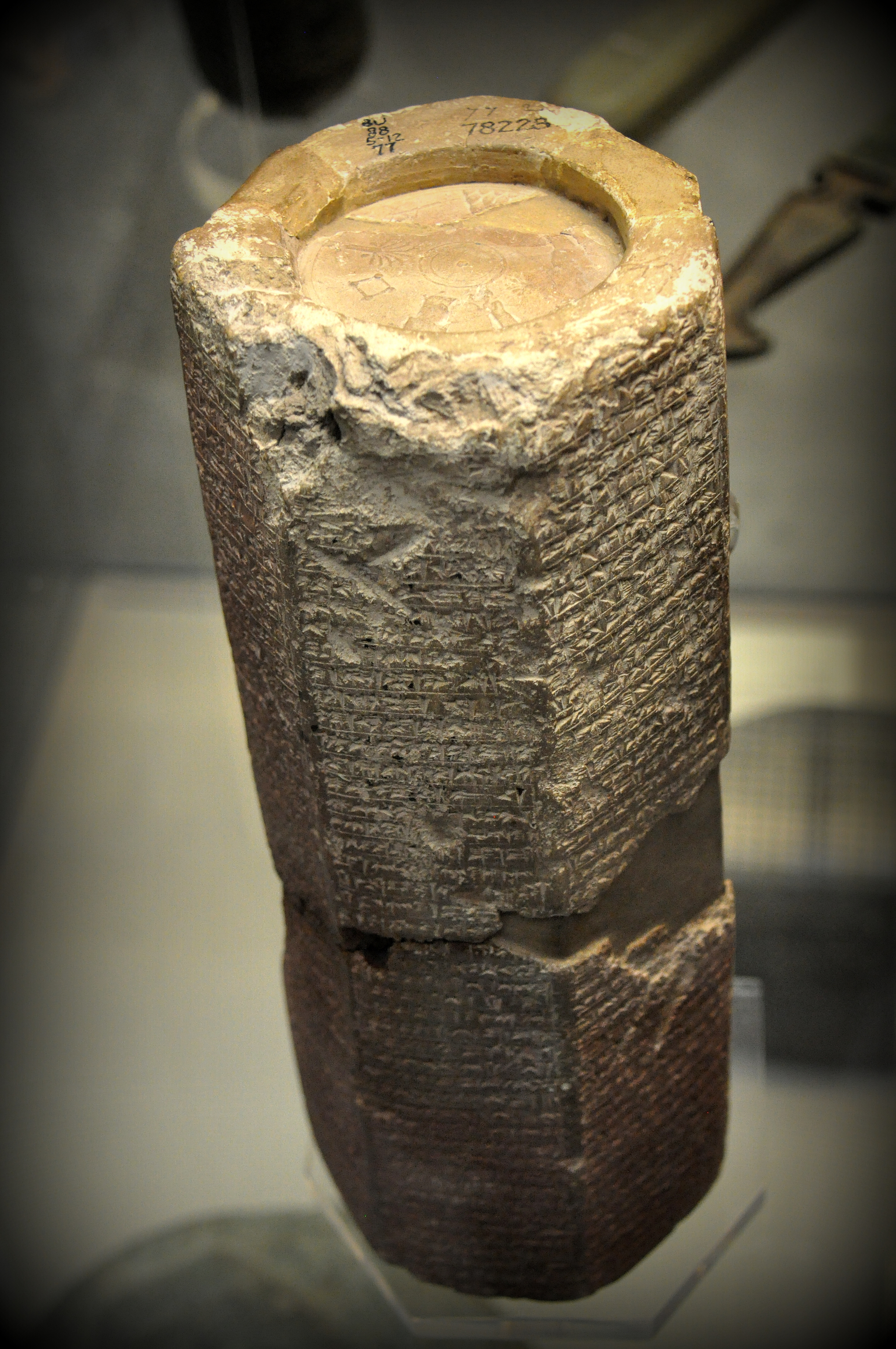
Terracotta record of Esarhaddon's restoration of Babylon. c. 670 BC. Exhibited at the British Museum.

Great king, mighty monarch, lord of all, king of the land of Assur, ruler of Babylon, faithful shepherd, beloved of Marduk, lord of lords, dutiful leader, loved by Marduk's Consort Zurpanitum, humble, obedient, full of praise for their strength and awestruck from his earliest days in the presence of their divine greatness. [am I, Esarhaddon]. When in the reign of an earlier king there were ill omens, the city offended its gods and was destroyed at their command. It was I, Esarhaddon, whom they chose to restore everything to its rightful place, to calm their anger, and to assuage their wrath. You, Marduk, entrusted the protection of the land of Assur to me. The Gods of Babylon, meanwhile, told me to rebuild their shrines and renew the proper religious observances of their palace, Esagila. I called up all my workmen and conscripted all the people of Babylonia. I set them to work, digging up the ground and carrying the earth away in baskets.

Esarhaddon successfully rebuilt the city gates, battlements, drains, courtyards, shrines, and various other buildings and structures. Great care was taken during the rebuilding of the Esagila, depositing precious stones, scented oils, and perfumes into its foundations. Precious metals were chosen to cover the doors of the temple, and the pedestal that was to house the statue of Bel was constructed in gold. A report from the governor Esarhaddon installed in Babylon confirms that the reconstruction was very well received by the Babylonians:

I have entered Babylon. The Babylonians have received me kindly, and daily they bless the king, saying, "What was taken and plundered from Babylon, he has returned," and from Sippar to Bab-marrat the chiefs of the Chaldeans bless the king, saying, "(It is he) who resettled (the people) of Babylon."

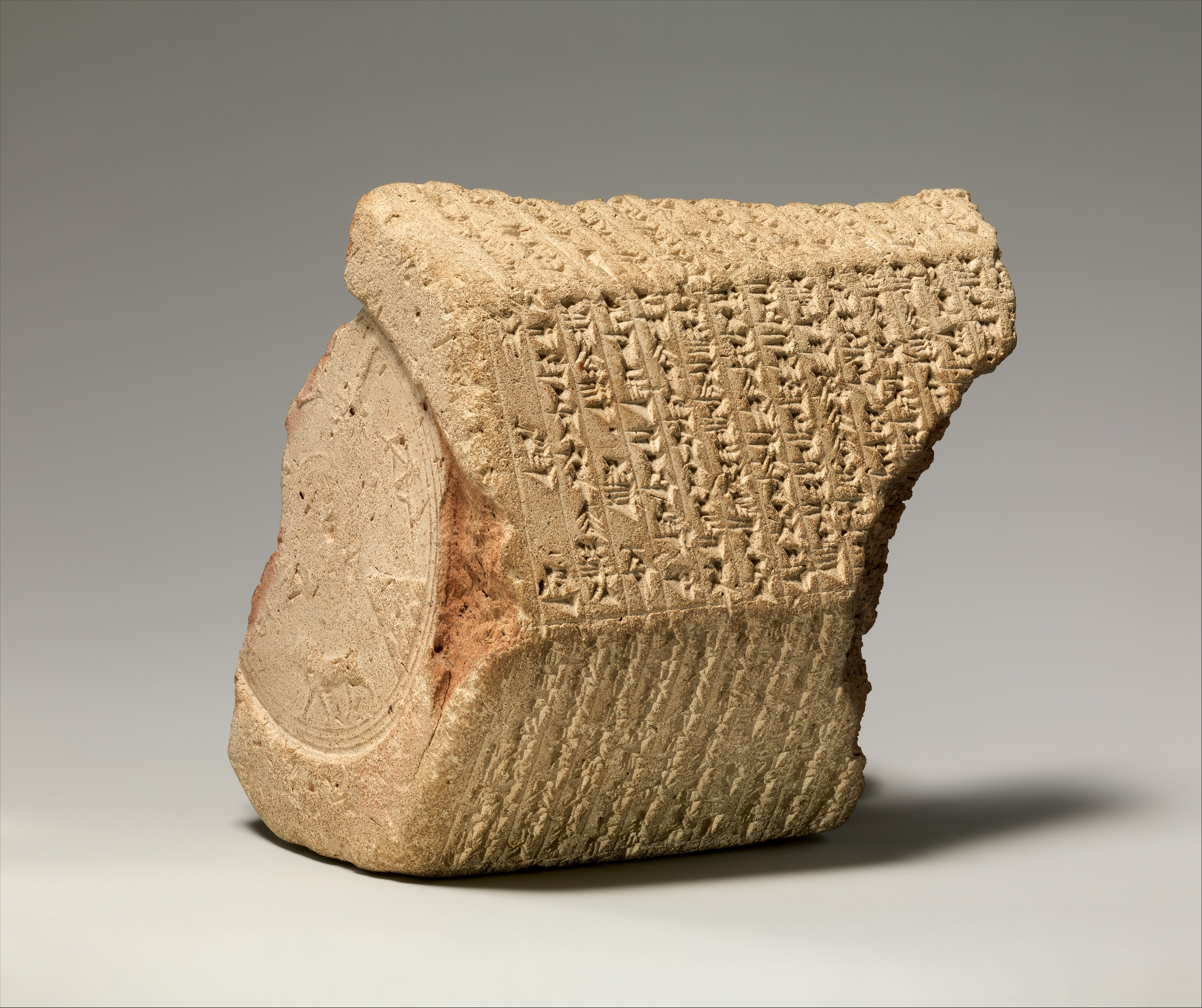
Another clay record of Esarhaddon's restoration of Babylon. Exhibited at the Metropolitan Museum of Art.

The rebuilding of the city was not completed during Esarhaddon's lifetime, and much work was also done during the reign of his successors. Exactly how much of the reconstruction was done during the reign of Esarhaddon is uncertain, but stones with his inscriptions are found in the ruins of the city's temples, suggesting that a substantial amount of work had been completed. Esarhaddon likely fulfilled most of his restoration goals, including the near-complete restoration of Esagila and Etemenanki, with the possible exception of the city walls, which were likely fully restored by his successor.

Esarhaddon also sponsored restoration programs in other southern cities. In his first regnal year, Esarhaddon returned the statues of various southern gods that had been captured in wars and held in Assyria. During the time since Sennacherib's destruction of the city, the statue of Bel had, along with statues of several other traditional Babylonian deities, been kept at the town of Issete in the northeastern parts of Assyria. Although the statue of Bel remained in Assyria, statues of other gods were returned to the cities of Der, Humhumia, and Sippar-aruru. In the years to follow, statues were also returned to the cities of Larsa and Uruk. As he had in Babylon, Esarhaddon also cleared away debris in Uruk and repaired the city's Eanna temple, dedicated to the goddess Ishtar. Similar small-scale restoration projects were undertaken in the cities of Nippur, Borsippa and Akkad.

Because of Esarhaddon's extensive building projects in the south and his efforts to link himself to the Babylonian royal tradition, some scholars have described him as the "Babylonian king of Assyria," but such a view might misrepresent the actual efforts of the king. Esarhaddon was king of both Assyria and Babylonia, and his military and political base remained in the north, much like his predecessors. While his southern building projects were impressive, ambitious, and unprecedented, he completed projects in the Assyrian heartland as well, although they were not as civically oriented as those in Babylonia. In Assyria, Esarhaddon constructed and restored temples but also worked on palaces and military fortifications.

Possibly to reassure the Assyrian people that his projects in the south would be matched with projects of equal proportion in the north, Esarhaddon ensured that repairs were made to the temple of Ešarra in Assur, one of the chief temples of northern Mesopotamia. Similar projects were conducted for temples in the Assyrian capital, Nineveh and in the city of Arbela. Though the temple-building projects conducted in the south were matched with temple-building projects in the north, Esarhaddon's prioritizing of Assyria over Babylonia is apparent from the various administrative and military building projects undertaken in the north and the complete lack of such projects in the south.

=== Military campaigns ===
Political map of Assyria's (purple) northern border 680–610 BC. Urartu (yellow) was one of Esarhaddon's main rivals.

Vassals who had hoped to use the unstable political climate in Assyria to free themselves, perhaps believing that the new king hadn't yet consolidated his position well enough to stop them, and foreign powers eager to expand their territory soon realized that (despite Esarhaddon's distrust) the governors and soldiers of Assyria fully supported the new king. Two of the principal threats to Assyria were the Kingdom of Urartu under King Rusa II in the north, a sworn enemy of Assyria that still sheltered his brothers, and the Cimmerians, an Iranic nomadic tribe that was harassing his western borders.

Esarhaddon allied with the nomadic Scythians, famous for their cavalry, to dissuade the Cimmerians from attacking, but it didn't appear to have helped. In 679 BC, the Cimmerians invaded the westernmost provinces of the empire, and by 676 they had penetrated further into Esarhaddon's empire, destroying temples and cities on the way. To stop this invasion, Esarhaddon personally led his soldiers in battle in Cilicia and successfully repelled the Cimmerians. In his inscriptions, Esarhaddon claims to personally have killed the Cimmerian king Teušpa.

While the Cimmerian invasion was underway, one of Esarhaddon's vassals in the Levant, the Phoenician city-state of Sidon, rebelled against his rule. Sidon had only recently been conquered by Assyria, having been made a vassal by Esarhaddon's father in 701. Esarhaddon marched his army down along the Mediterranean coast and captured the rebellious city in 677, but its king, Abdi-Milkutti, escaped by boat. He was captured and executed a year later, the same year that Esarhaddon decisively defeated the Cimmerians. Another rebellious vassal king, Sanduarri of "Kundu and Sissu" (likely locations in Cilicia), was also defeated and executed. To celebrate his victory, Esarhaddon had the heads of the two vassal kings hung around the necks of their nobles, who were paraded around Nineveh. Sidon was reduced to an Assyrian province, and two cities that had been under the Sidonian king's control were gifted to another vassal king, Baal of Tyre. Esarhaddon discusses his victory over Sidon in a contemporary inscription:

Abdi-milkutti, king of Sidon, who did not fear my majesty, did not heed the word of my lips, who trusted in the fearful sea and cast off my yoke—Sidon, his garrison city, which lies in the midst of the sea [missing portion]
Like a fish I caught him up out of the sea and cut off his head. His wife, his sons, the people of his palace, property and goods, precious stones, garments of coloured wool and linen, maple and boxwood, and all kinds of treasures of his palace, in great abundance, I carried off. His widespread people—there was no numbering them, cattle, sheep and asses, in great number—I transported to Assyria.

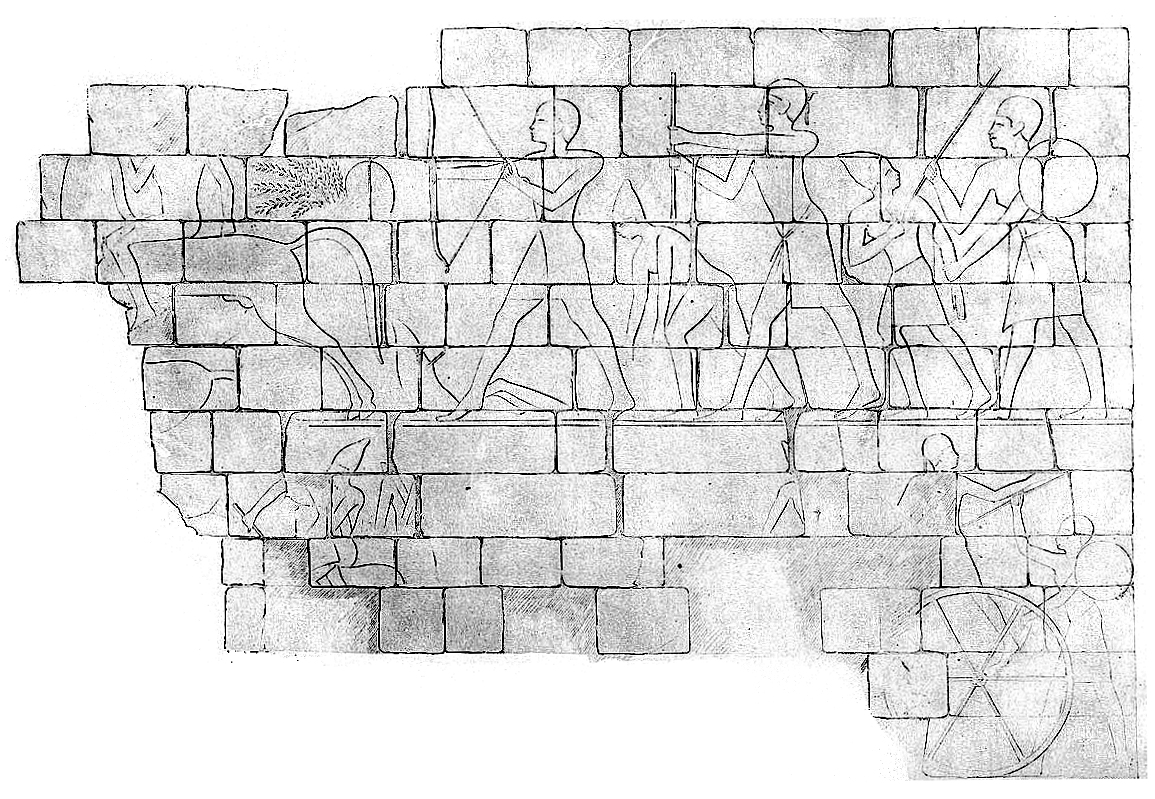
Relief from the Temple of Amun, Jebel Barkal, showing Kushites defeating Assyrians

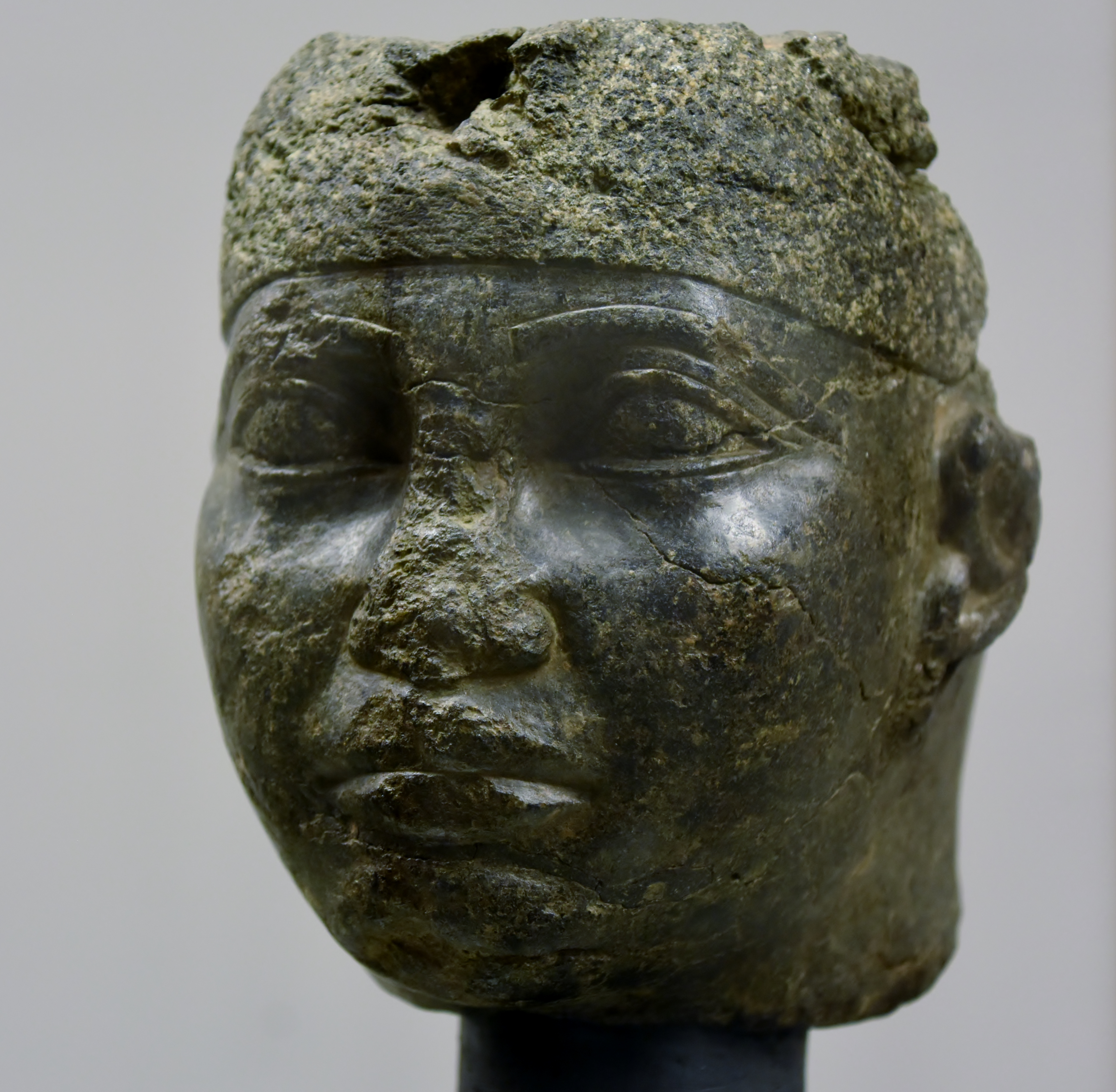
The "Black Pharaoh" Taharqa of Egypt was a recurring enemy of Esarhaddon, defeating his planned invasion of Egypt in 673 BC and in turn being defeated by Esarhaddon in 671 BC. Ny Carlsberg Glyptotek, Copenhagen.

After dealing with the problems in Sidon and Cilicia, Esarhaddon turned his attention to Urartu. At first, he struck at the Mannaeans, a people allied with Urartu, but by 673 he was openly at war with the kingdom of Urartu itself. As part of this war, Esarhaddon attacked and conquered the kingdom of Shupria, a vassal kingdom to Urartu whose capital Ubumu was located on the shores of Lake Van. The king's casus belli for this invasion was the king of Shupria's refusal to hand over political refugees from Assyria (possibly some of the conspirators behind Sennacherib's death), and though the Shuprian king had agreed to give up the refugees after a long series of letters, Esarhaddon considered it took him too long to relent. The Assyrians seized and plundered the city after the defenders had attempted to burn down the Assyrian siege weapons and the fires had instead spread into Ubumu. The political refugees were captured and executed. Some criminals from Urartu, whom the Shuprian king had similarly refused to give up to the king of Urartu, were seized and sent to Urartu, perhaps to improve relations. Ubumu was repaired, renamed, and annexed, with two eunuchs being appointed as its governors.

In 675, the Elamites invaded Babylonia and captured the city of Sippar. The Assyrian army had been away at the time, campaigning in Anatolia, and was forced to abandon this campaign to defend the southern provinces. Little is recorded of this conflict, and as the fall of Sippar was an embarrassment, it is not mentioned by Esarhaddon in any of his inscriptions. Shortly after seizing Sippar, the Elamite king Khumban-khaltash II died, which left the new Elamite king, Urtak, in a bad position. To repair relations with Assyria and avoid further conflict, Urtak abandoned the invasion and returned some statues of gods which the Elamites had stolen. The two monarchs allied and exchanged children to be raised at each other's courts.

Near the end of Esarhaddon's seventh year on the throne, in the winter of 673, the king invaded Egypt. This invasion, which only a few Assyrian sources discuss, ended in what some scholars have assumed was possibly one of Assyria's worst defeats. The Egyptians had for years sponsored rebels and dissenters in Assyria, and Esarhaddon had hoped to storm Egypt and take this rival out in one fell swoop. Because Esarhaddon had marched his army at great speed, the Assyrians were exhausted once they arrived outside the Egyptian-controlled city of Ashkelon, where they were defeated by the Kushite Pharaoh Taharqa. Following this defeat, Esarhaddon abandoned his plan to conquer Egypt for the moment and withdrew back to Nineveh.

=== Deteriorating health and depression ===
By the time of Esarhaddon's first failed invasion of Egypt in 673 BC, it had become apparent that the king's health was deteriorating. This presented a problem since one of the chief requirements of being the Assyrian king was that one had perfect mental and physical health. The king was constantly suffering from some illness and would often spend days in his sleeping quarters without food, drink and human contact. The death of Esharra-hammat, his beloved wife, in February 672 BC is unlikely to have improved his condition. Surviving court documents overwhelmingly point to Esarhaddon often being sad. The deaths of his wife and their recently born infant child made Esarhaddon depressed. This can clearly be seen in letters written by the king's chief exorcist Adad-shumu-usur, the man who was chiefly responsible for Esarhaddon's well-being. One such letter reads:

As to what the king, my lord, wrote to me: "I am feeling very sad; how did we act that I have become so depressed for this little one of mine?" Had it been curable, you would have given away half your kingdom to have it cured! But what can we do? O king, my lord, it is something that cannot be done.

Notes and letters preserved from those at the royal court, including Esarhaddon's physicians, describe his condition in some detail, discussing violent vomiting, constant fever, nosebleeds, dizziness, painful earaches, diarrhea and depression. The king often feared that his death was near, and his condition would have been apparent to anyone who saw him, as he was affected by a permanent skin rash which covered most of his body, including his face. The physicians, likely the best in Assyria, were perplexed and eventually had to confess that they were powerless to aid him. This is clearly expressed in their letters, such as the following:

My lord, the king, keeps telling me: "Why do you not identify the nature of my disease and find a cure?" As I told the king already in person, his symptoms cannot be classified.

Because the Assyrians saw illness as divine punishment, a king who was ill would have been seen as an indication that the gods were not supportive of him. Because of this, Esarhaddon's poor health had to be hidden from his subjects at all costs. That his subjects remained unaware was ensured through the ancient royal Assyrian tradition that anyone who approached the king had to be both on their knees and veiled.

=== Planning the succession ===
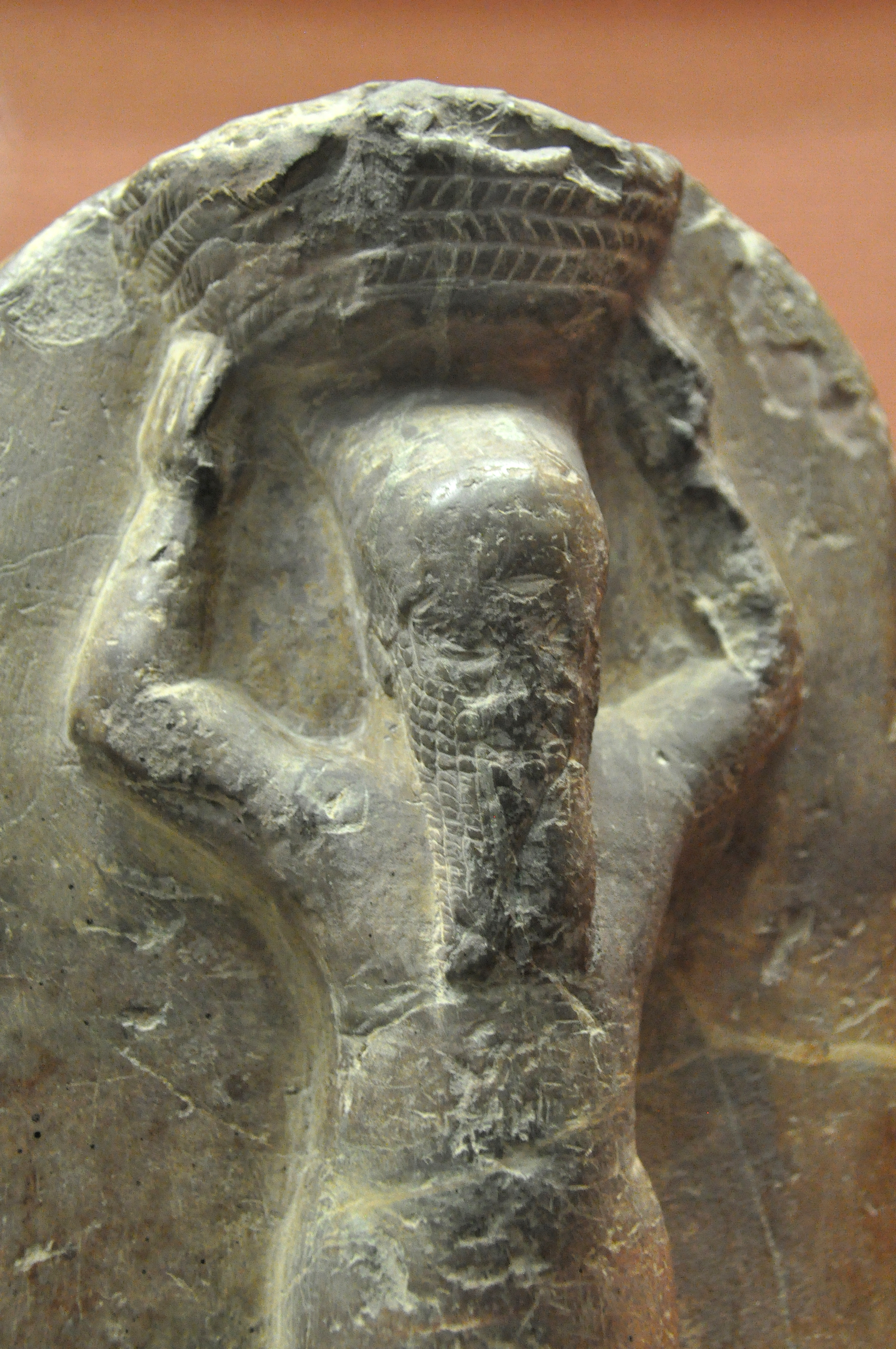
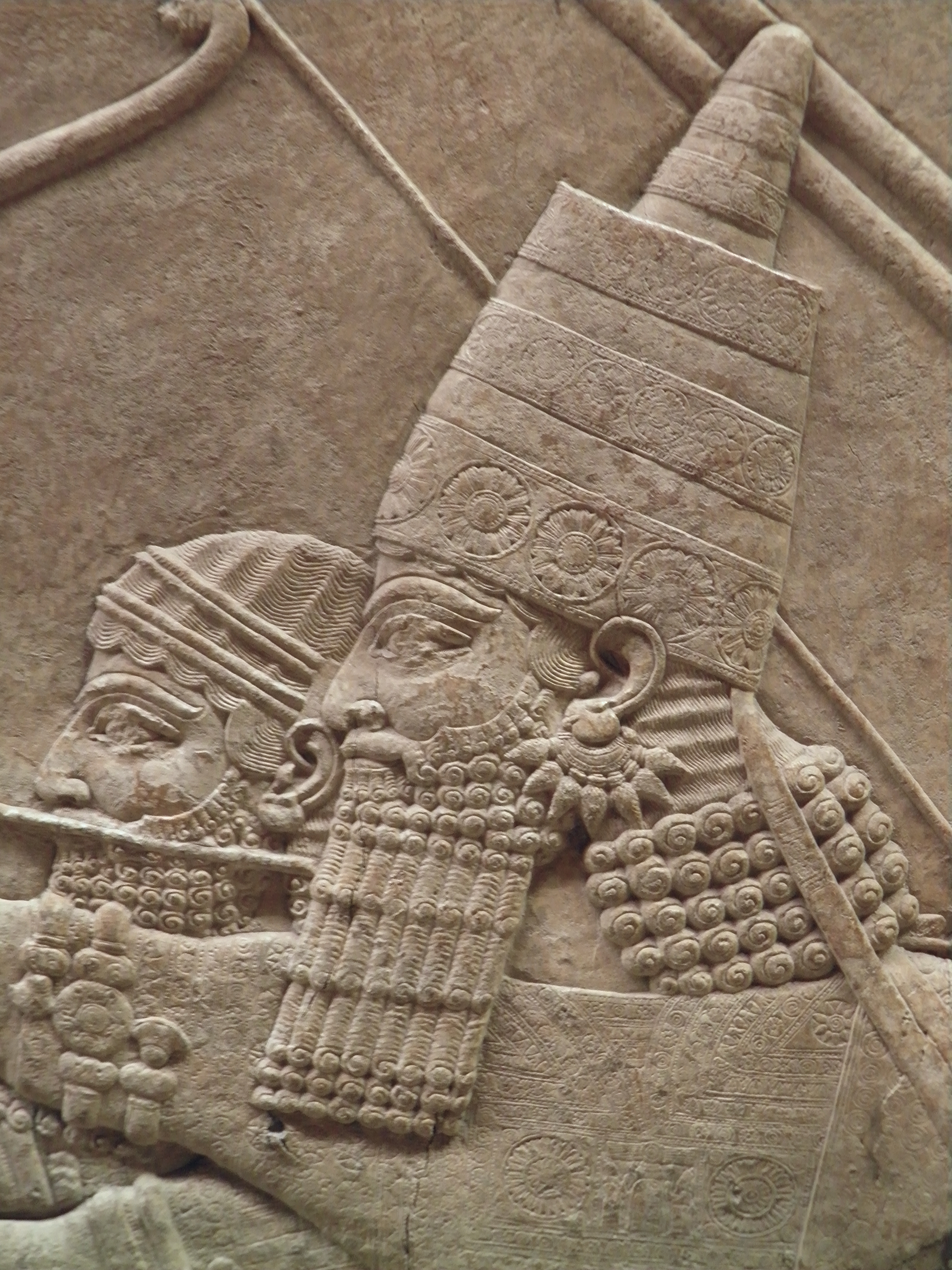
In 672 BC, Esarhaddon appointed his eldest living son Shamash-shum-ukin (left, from a stone monument now housed in the British Museum) as the heir to Babylon and the younger son Ashurbanipal (right, from the Lion Hunt of Ashurbanipal) as the heir to Assyria.

Seeing as he himself had only acquired the Assyrian throne with great difficulty, Esarhaddon took several steps to ensure that the transition of power following his own death would be a smooth and peaceful one. A treaty concluded between Esarhaddon and his vassal Ramataia, the ruler of a Median kingdom in the east called Urakazabarna in c. 672 BC makes it clear that all of Esarhaddon's sons were still minors at the time, which was problematic. The same treaty also shows that Esarhaddon was worried that there might be several factions who might oppose his successor's rise to the throne after his death, listing potential opposing forces as his successor's brothers, uncles and cousins and even "descendants of former royalty" and "one of the chiefs or governors of Assyria".

This indicates that at least some of Esarhaddon's brothers were still alive at this point and that they or their children could possibly represent threats to his own children. The mention of "descendants of former royalty" might allude to the fact that Esarhaddon's grandfather Sargon II had acquired the Assyrian throne through usurpation and may not have been related to any earlier Assyrian king. Descendants of earlier kings may still have been alive and in a position to press their claims on the Assyrian throne.

To avoid a civil war upon his death, Esarhaddon appointed his eldest son Sin-nadin-apli as crown prince in 674, but he died just two years later, again threatening a succession crisis. This time, Esarhaddon appointed two crown princes; his eldest living son Shamash-shum-ukin was selected as the heir to Babylon, whilst a younger son, Ashurbanipal, was selected as the heir to Assyria. The two princes arrived at the capital of Nineveh together and partook in a celebration with foreign representatives, Assyrian nobles, and soldiers. Promoting one of his sons as the heir to Assyria and another as the heir to Babylon was a new idea, for in the past decades the Assyrian king had simultaneously been the King of Babylon.

The choice to name a younger son as the crown prince of Assyria, which was clearly Esarhaddon's primary title, and an older son as the crown prince of Babylon, might be explained by the mothers of the two sons. While Ashurbanipal's mother was likely Assyrian in origin, Shamash-shum-ukin was the son of a woman from Babylon (though this is uncertain, Ashurbanipal and Shamash-shum-ukin may have shared the same mother which would probably have had problematic consequences if Shamash-shum-ukin was to ascend to the Assyrian throne). Since Ashurbanipal was the next oldest son, he was the superior candidate for the throne. Esarhaddon probably surmised that the Babylonians would be content with someone of Babylonian heritage as their king and, as such, set Shamash-shum-ukin to inherit Babylon and the southern parts of his empire instead. Treaties drawn up by Esarhaddon are somewhat unclear as to the relationship he intended his two sons to have. It is clear that Ashurbanipal was the primary heir to the empire and that Shamash-shum-ukin was to swear him an oath of allegiance, but other parts also specify that Ashurbanipal was not to interfere in Shamash-shum-ukin's affairs, which indicates a more equal standing. The two crown princes soon became heavily involved with Assyrian politics, which lifted some of the burden from the shoulders of their sickly father.

Esarhaddon's mother Naqiʾa ensured that any potential enemies and claimants took an oath to support Ashurbanipal's rise to the Assyrian throne, another step to avoid the bloodshed which had begun Esarhaddon's own reign. To ensure the succession of Ashurbanipal and Shamash-shum-ukin, Esarhaddon himself also concluded succession treaties with at least six independent rulers in the east and with several of his own governors outside the Assyrian heartland in 672. Perhaps the main motivating factor to create these treaties was the possibility that his brothers, particularly Arda-Mulissu, were still alive and sought to claim the Assyrian throne. Some inscriptions suggest that they were alive and free as late as 673.

=== Conquest of Egypt and substitute kings ===
Victory stele of Esarhaddon

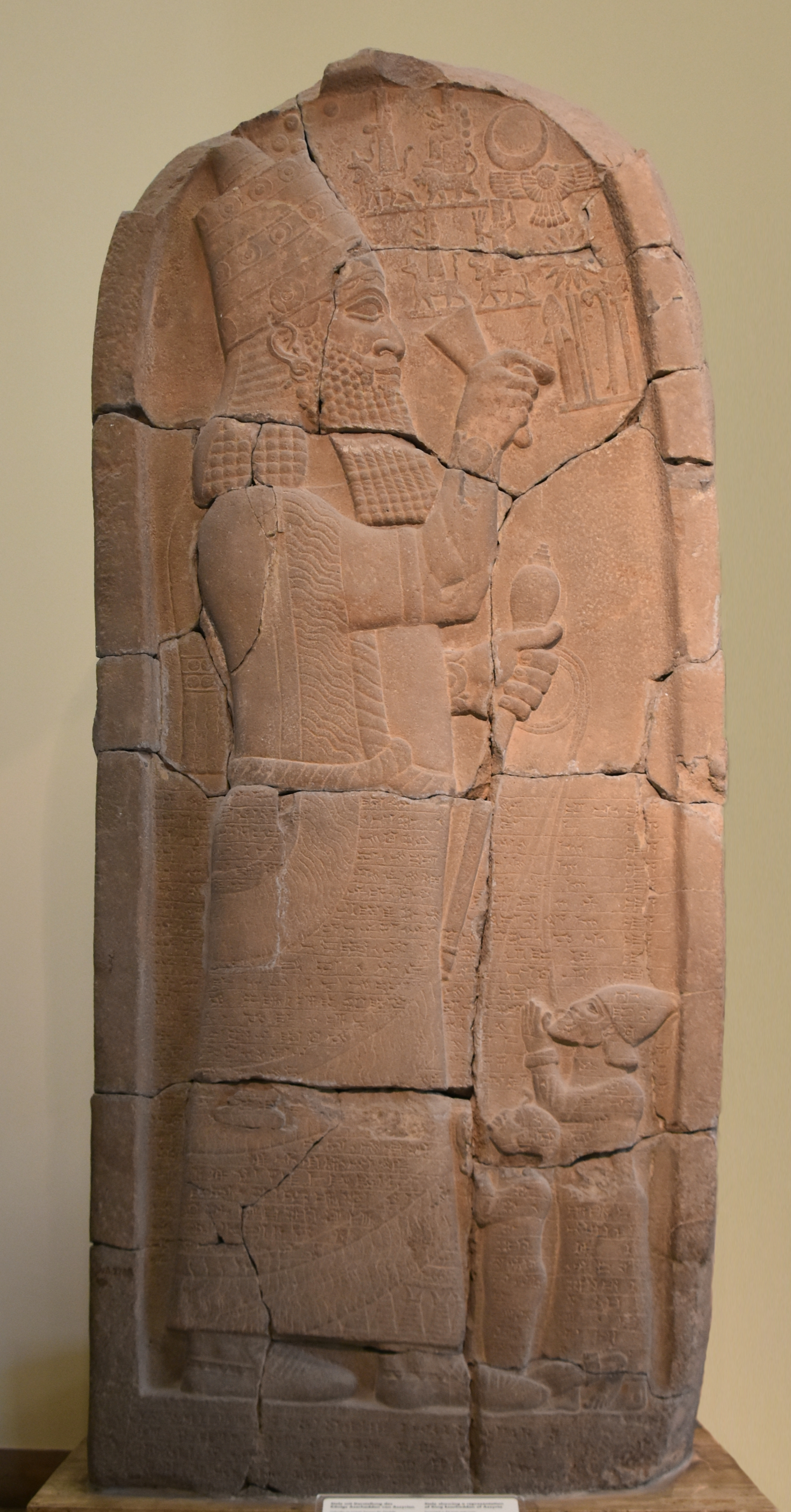
The Victory Stele

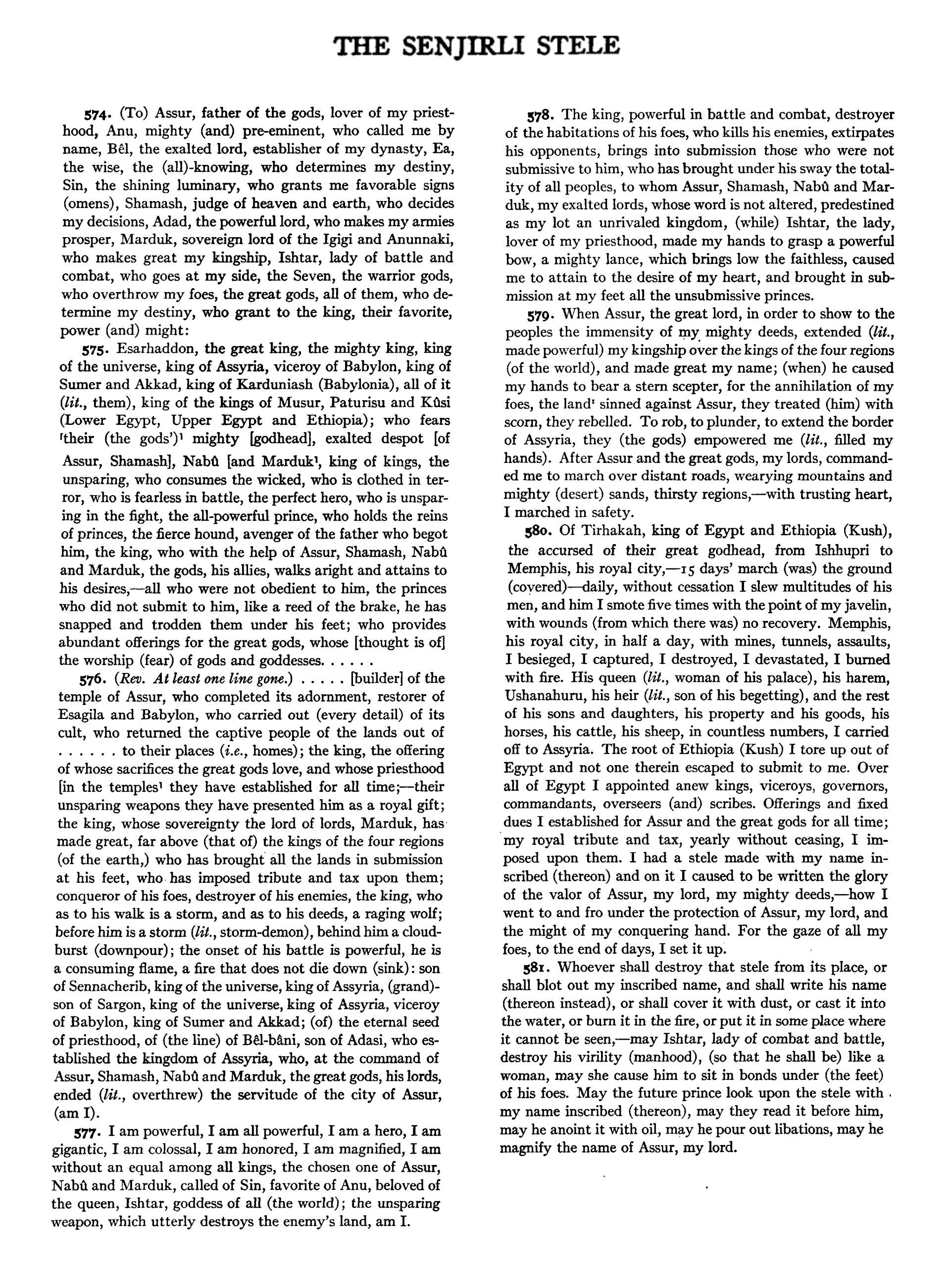
Translation

The Victory stele of Esarhaddon (now in the Pergamon Museum) was created following the king's victory in Egypt and depicts Esarhaddon in a majestic pose with a war mace in his hand and a vassal king kneeling before him. Also present is the son of Taharqa, the defeated pharaoh, kneeling and with a rope around his neck.

In the early months of 671 BC, Esarhaddon again marched against Egypt. The army assembled for this second Egyptian campaign was considerably larger than the one Esarhaddon had used in 673 and he marched at a much slower speed to avoid the problems that had plagued his previous attempt. On his way he passed through Harran, one of the major cities in the western parts of his empire. Here, a prophecy was revealed to the king, which predicted that Esarhaddon's conquest of Egypt would be a successful one. According to a letter sent to Ashurbanipal after Esarhaddon's death, the prophecy was the following:

When Esarhaddon marched to Egypt, a temple of cedar wood was erected at Harran. There, the god Sin was enthroned on a wooden column, two crowns on his head, and standing in front of him was the god Nuska. Esarhaddon entered and placed the crowns onto his head, and the following was proclaimed: 'You shall go forth and conquer the world!' And he went and conquered Egypt.

Three months after having received this prophecy, Esarhaddon's forces were victorious in their first battle with the Egyptians. Despite the prophecy and initial success, Esarhaddon was not convinced of his own safety. Just eleven days after he had defeated the Egyptians, he performed the substitute king ritual, an ancient Assyrian method intended to protect and shield the king from imminent danger announced by some sort of omen. Esarhaddon had performed the ritual earlier in his reign, but this time it left him unable to command his invasion of Egypt.

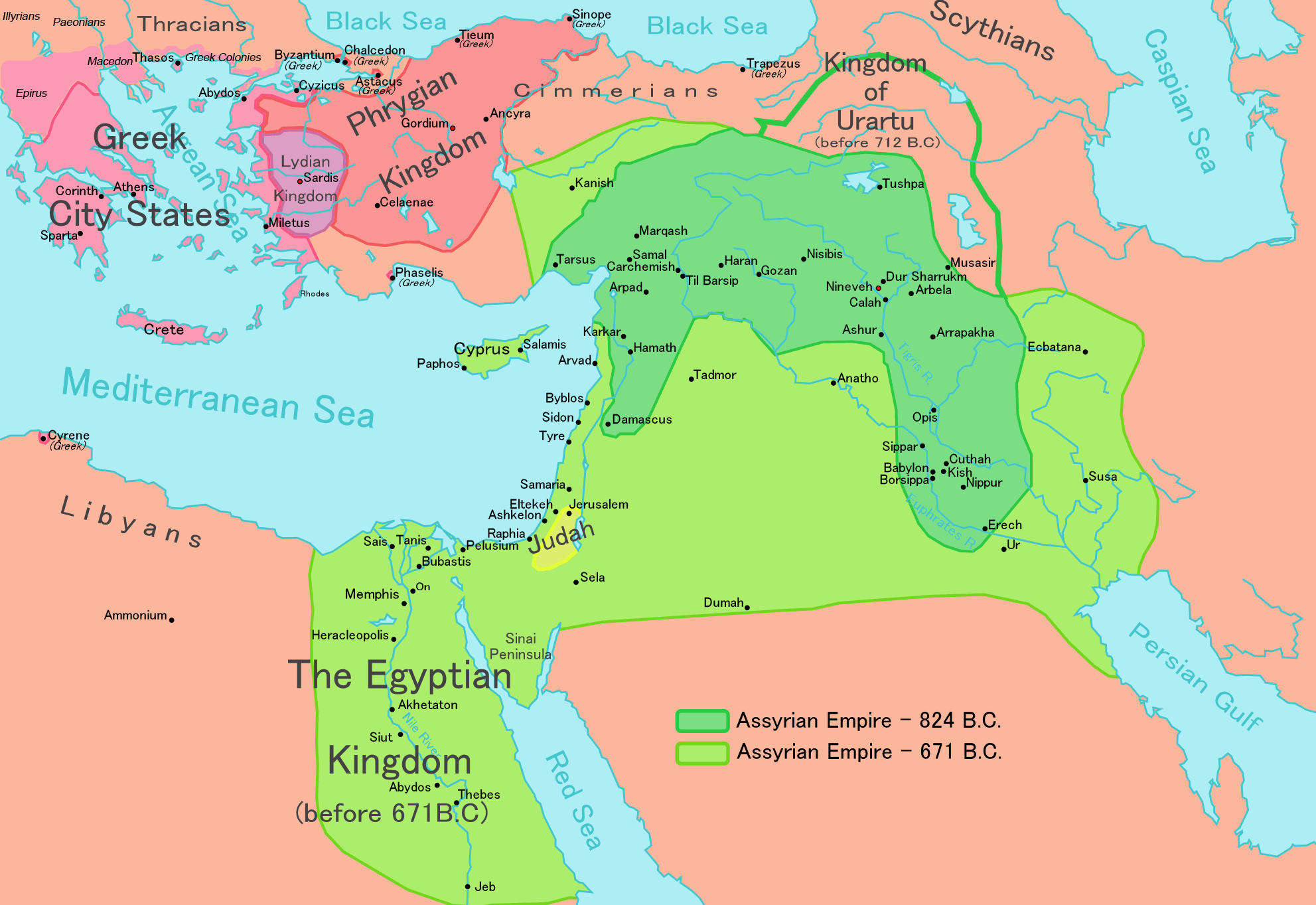
The Neo-Assyrian Empire in 671 BC, after Esarhaddon's successful invasion of Egypt.

The "substitute king" ritual involved the Assyrian monarch going into hiding for a hundred days, during which a substitute (preferably one with mental deficiencies) took the king's place by sleeping in the royal bed, wearing the crown and the royal garbs and eating the king's food. During these hundred days, the actual king remained hidden and was known only under the alias "the farmer". The goal of the ritual was that any evil intended for the king would instead be focused on the substitute king, who was killed regardless of if anything had happened at the end of the hundred days, keeping the real monarch safe.

Whatever omen Esarhaddon was fearing, he survived 671 and would perform the ritual twice during the two years that followed, which left him unable to fulfill his duties as the Assyrian king for a total of almost a year. During this time, most of the civil administration of his empire was overseen by his crown princes and the army in Egypt was likely commanded by his chief eunuch, Ashur-nasir. The Assyrian army defeated the Egyptians in two additional battles and successfully seized and plundered the Egyptian capital of Memphis. The Assyrian army was also forced to fight some of their vassals in the Levant, such as Baal of Tyre, who had allied with the Egyptians against Esarhaddon.

Although the Pharaoh Taharqa had escaped, Esarhaddon captured the Pharaoh's family, including his son and wife, and most of the royal court, which were sent back to Assyria as hostages. Governors loyal to the Assyrian king were placed in charge of the conquered territories. In his victory stele, erected to commemorate the defeat of Egypt, Esarhaddon is depicted in a majestic pose with a war mace in his hand and a vassal king kneeling before him. Also present is the son of the defeated pharaoh, kneeling and with a rope around his neck. The conquest resulted in the relocation of a large number of Egyptians to the Assyrian heartland. In an excerpt from the text inscribed on his victory stele, Esarhaddon describes the conquest with the following words:

I slew multitudes of his [e.g. Taharqa's] men and I smote him five times with the point of my javelin, with wounds from which there was no recovery. Memphis, his royal city, in half a day, with mines, tunnels, assaults, I besieged, I captured, I destroyed, I devastated, I burned with fire. His queen, his harem, Ushanahuru, his heir, and the rest of his sons and daughters, his property and his goods, his horses, his cattle, his sheep, in countless numbers, I carried off to Assyria. The root of Kush I tore up out of Egypt, and not one therein escaped to submit to me. Over all of Egypt, I appointed kings, viceroys, governors, commandants, overseers and scribes. Offerings and fixed dues I established for Assur and the great gods for all time; my royal tribute and tax, yearly without ceasing, I imposed upon them.
I had a stele made with my name inscribed thereon and on it I caused it to be written the glory and valor of Assur, my lord, my mighty deeds, how I went to and from the protection of Assur, my lord, and the might of my conquering hand. For the gaze of all my foes, to the end of days, I set it up.

=== Conspiracy of 671–670 BC ===
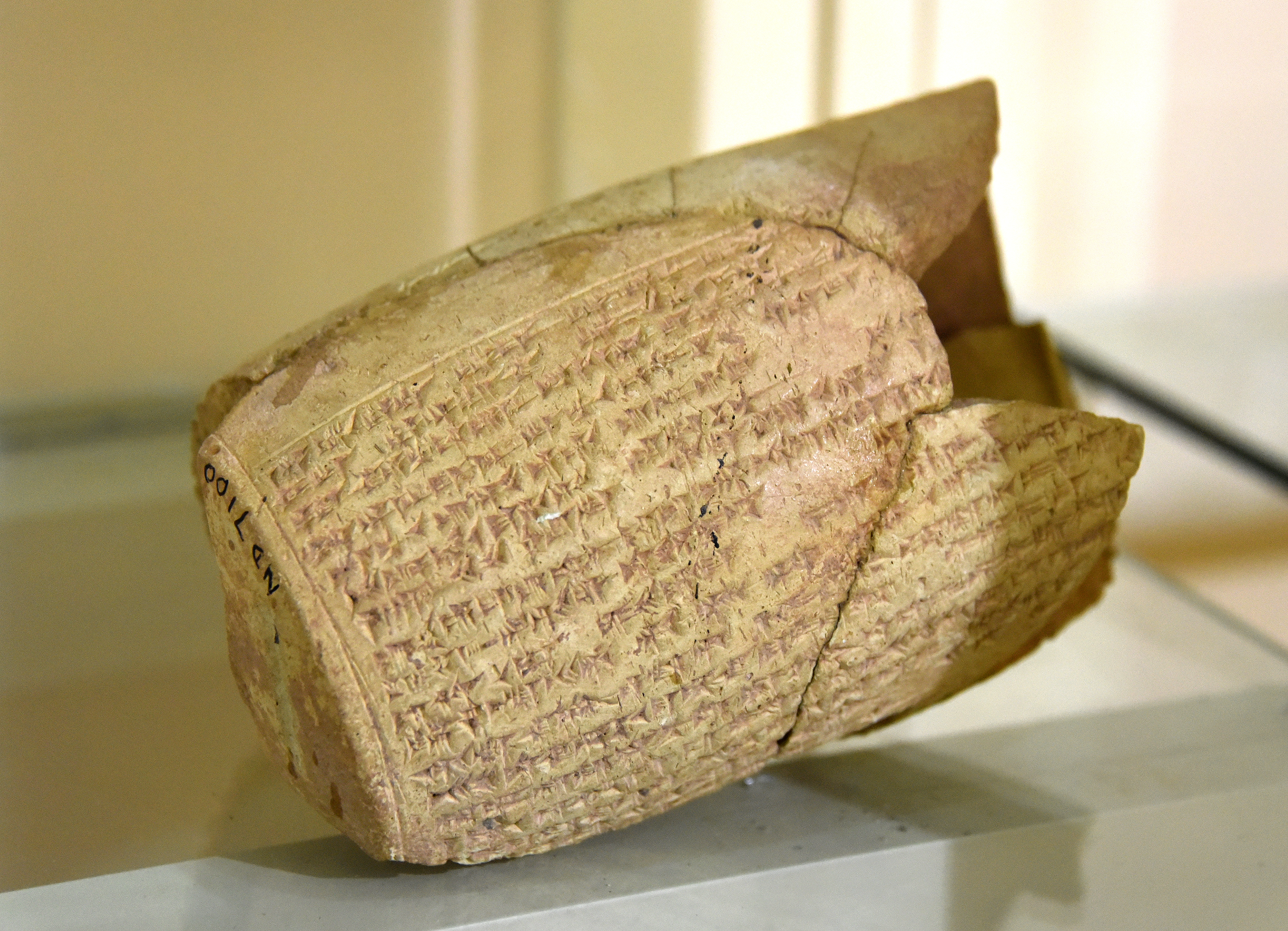
Cylinder with an inscription by Esarhaddon from his palace at Nimrud. Exhibited at the Erbil Civilization Museum.

Shortly following Esarhaddon's victory in Egypt, news spread throughout his empire of a new prophecy at Harran. Since Esarhaddon had conquered Egypt and proven the previous prophecy from the city right, the oracles of Harran were seen as trustworthy. The prophecy, spoken by an ecstatic woman (the oracle of Nusku), was the following:

This is the word of the god Nusku: Kingship belongs to Sasî. I shall destroy the name and the seed of Sennacherib!

The meaning of the prophecy was clear: it provided a possible religious foundation for a revolt against Esarhaddon's rule by declaring all of Sennacherib's descendants as usurpers. It is possible that Esarhaddon's skin condition would have become apparent during his visit to Harran, which might be the reason for declaring him illegitimate. The identity of the Sasî who was proclaimed as the rightful king is unknown, but he might have been connected to previous Assyrian royalty in some manner to give him a claim to the throne. It is possible that he was a descendant of Esarhaddon's grandfather Sargon II. Sasî managed to rally a large amount of support throughout the empire quickly, perhaps even rallying Esarhaddon's chief eunuch Ashur-nasir to his side.

It did not take long for Esarhaddon to learn of the conspiracy. Because of his paranoia, Esarhaddon had a vast information network of servants throughout the empire, sworn to report to him once they heard of any planned actions against him. Through these reports, Esarhaddon was made aware that conspirators were active not only in Harran, but also in Babylon and in the Assyrian heartland. For a while, Esarhaddon simply gathered information on the activities of the conspirators and fearing for his life, performed the "substitute king" ritual for a second time in 671 BC, just three months after he had previously completed it.

As soon as the ritual was complete, Esarhaddon emerged from hiding and brutally massacred the conspirators, the second such purge during his reign. The fate of Sasî and the woman who had proclaimed him king is unknown, but it is likely that they were captured and executed. Because of the extent of the officials killed, the administrative structure of Assyria suffered more than it had in many years. For the first few months of 670, no official was chosen to select the name of the year, something which was extremely rare in Assyrian history. Remains of several buildings in various cities, believed to have been the homes of supporters of Sasî, have been dated as having been destroyed in 670. The aftermath of the conspiracy saw Esarhaddon tighten security considerably. He introduced two new ranks into the court hierarchy to make it more difficult to meet him, which also limited the number of officials who controlled the access to his palaces.

=== Death ===
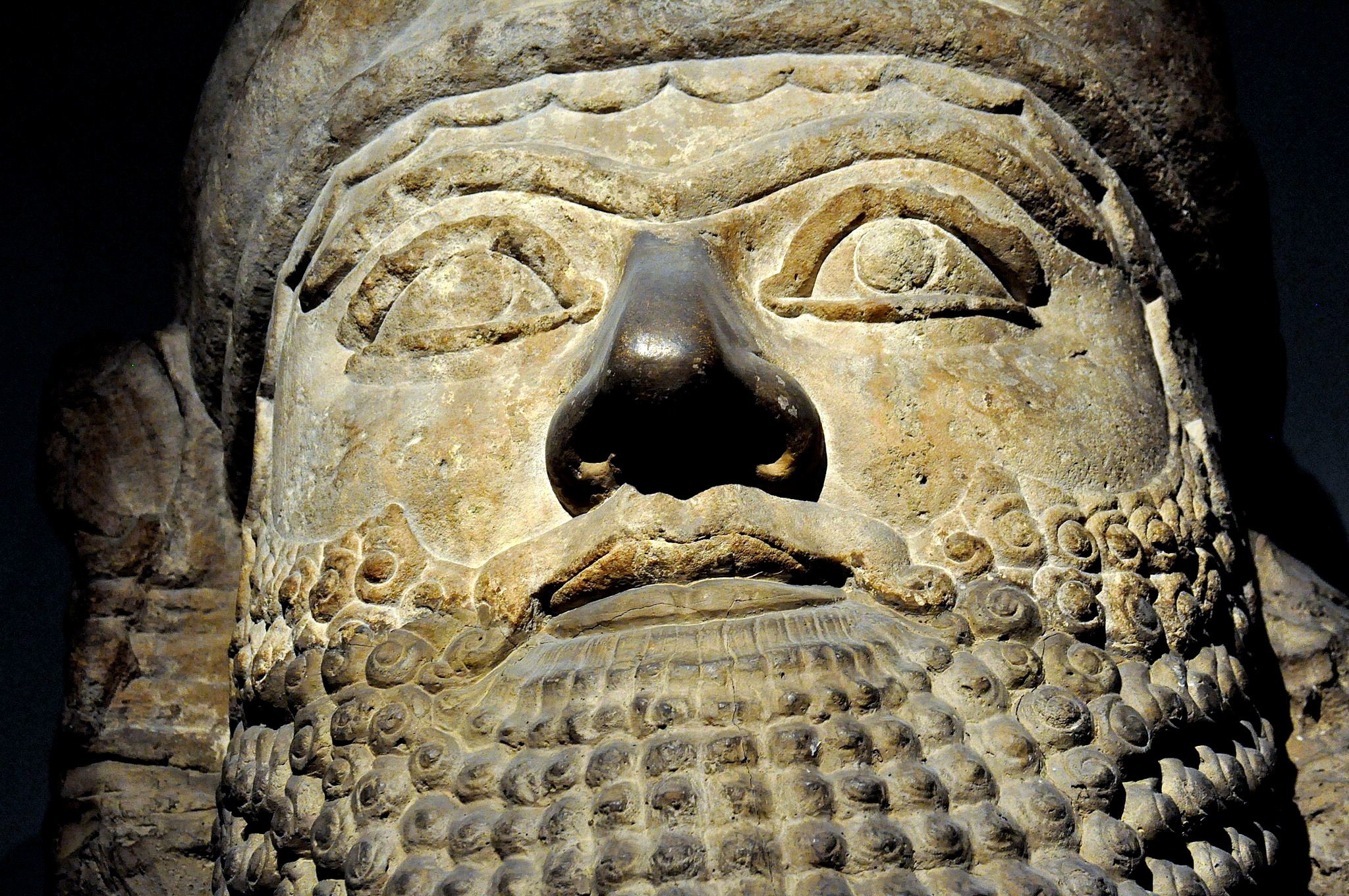
Head of a lamassu from the palace of Esarhaddon in Nimrud, c. 670 BC. Exhibited at the British Museum.

Although he had successfully survived the conspiracy, Esarhaddon remained diseased and paranoid. Just a year later, in 669 BC, he once more performed the "substitute king" ritual. Around this time, the defeated Pharaoh Taharqa appeared from the south and, perhaps combined with the chaotic political situation within Assyria, inspired Egypt to attempt to free itself from Esarhaddon's control.

Esarhaddon received word of this rebellion and learnt that even some of his own governors who he had appointed in Egypt had ceased to pay tribute to him and joined the rebels. After emerging from his hundred days of hiding, apparently relatively healthy by his standards, Esarhaddon left to campaign against Egypt for the third time. The king died at Harran on 10 Araḫsamn 669 BC (approximately November 1 in the proleptic Julian calendar), before reaching the Egyptian border. The absence of evidence to the contrary suggests that his death was natural and unexpected.

After Esarhaddon's death, his sons Ashurbanipal and Shamash-shum-ukin successfully ascended the thrones of Assyria and Babylonia without political turmoil and bloodshed, meaning that Esarhaddon's succession plans were a success, at least initially.

== Diplomacy ==
=== Diplomacy with the Arabs ===
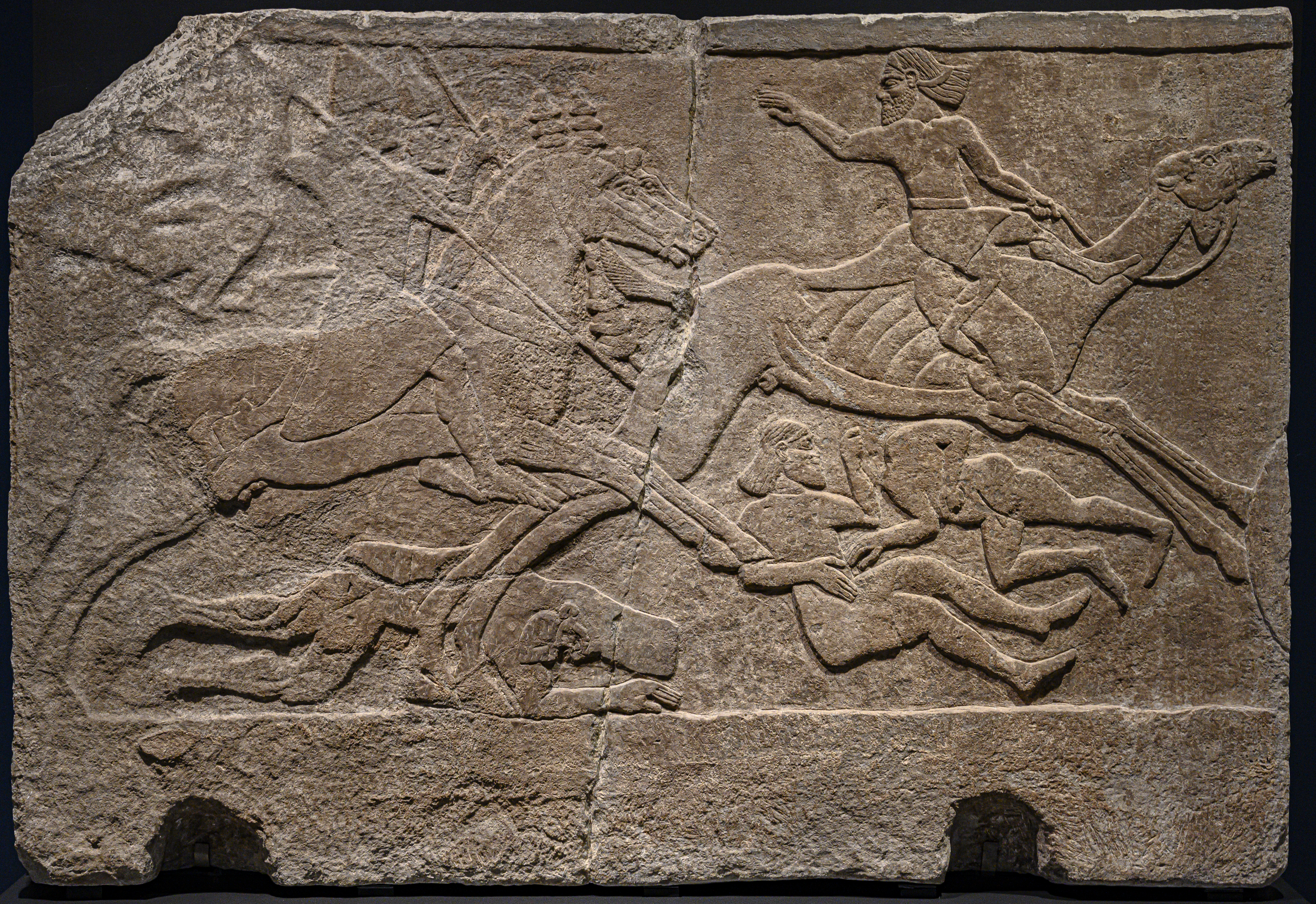
Assyrian relief depicting battle with camel riders, from Nimrud Central Palace, Tiglath Pileser III, 728 BCE, British Museum.

The support of the Arabic and other tribes of the Sinai Peninsula had been crucial in Esarhaddon's 671 BC Egyptian campaign. Esarhaddon was also determined to retain the loyalty of the Arabic tribes who had been subjugated by his father in the Arabian Peninsula, particularly around the city of Adummatu. The king of Adummatu, Hazael, paid tribute to Esarhaddon and sent him several presents, which were reciprocated by Esarhaddon through returning the statues of Hazael's gods which had been seized by Sennacherib years earlier. When Hazael died and was succeeded by his son Yauta, Yauta's position as king was recognized by Esarhaddon, who also aided the new king in defeating a rebellion against his rule. Shortly thereafter, Yauta rebelled against Esarhaddon, and though he was defeated by the Assyrian army and fled from his throne, during the reign of Ashurbanipal, he came back to power after being forgiven by the latter. Despite this, Yauta eventually tried to ditch his connections with the Neo-Assyrian Empire again, which prompted Ashurbanipal to invade his territory, capture him and take him to Nineveh where he was publicly shamed.

Esarhaddon also successfully appointed a woman who had been raised at the Assyrian royal palace, Tabua, as "queen of the Arabs" and allowed her to return to and govern her people. In another episode, Esarhaddon invaded the country of "Bazza" in 676 (assumed to be located in the east of the Arabian Peninsula) after being petitioned for aid by a local king of a city called Yadi. The campaign apparently saw the Assyrians defeating eight kings of this region and granting their conquests to the king of Yadi.

=== Diplomacy with the Medes ===
The reign of Esarhaddon saw many of the Medes and Persians becoming or remaining Assyrian vassals. Esarhaddon's armies had proven to the Medes that Assyria was a great power to be feared when the Assyrians defeated the Median kings Eparna and Shidirparna near Mount Bikni (the location of which is unknown beyond being located somewhere in central Media) at some point before 676 BC. As a result of this victory, many of the Medes willingly swore allegiance to Assyria and brought gifts to Nineveh and allowed Esarhaddon to appoint Assyrian governors to their lands.

When Esarhaddon made his subjects swear to uphold his wishes regarding the succession of Ashurbanipal and Shamash-shum-ukin, some of the vassals made to swear allegiance to his successors were rulers and princes from Media. Esarhaddon's relations with the Medes weren't always peaceful, as there are records of Median raids against Assyria as late as 672, and the Medes are constantly mentioned in Esarhaddon's requests to his oracle as potential enemies of Assyria. Among the chief rivals of Esarhaddon in Media was a figure the Assyrians called Kaštaritu, who raided Assyrian territory. This king is perhaps identical with Phraortes, the second king of the Median Empire.

== Family ==
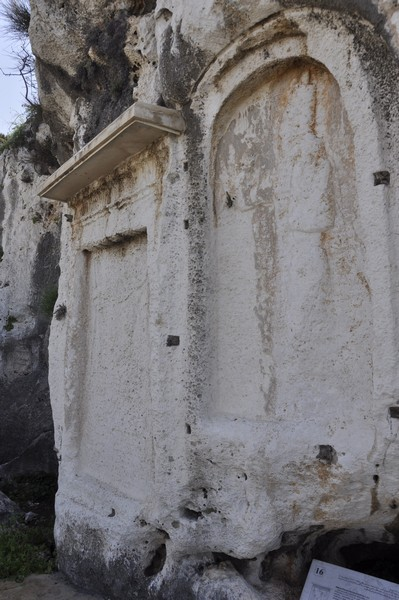
Commemorative stelae of Nahr el-Kalb by Esarhaddon (right) and Egyptian Pharaoh Ramesses II (left) by the estuary of the Nahr al-Kalb river, Lebanon.

=== Wives ===
From inscriptions, it can be ascertained that Esarhaddon had multiple wives, as his succession treaties differentiate between "sons born by Ashurbanipal's mother" and "the rest of the sons engendered by Esarhaddon". Only the name of one of these wives, Esarhaddon's queen Esharra-hammat (Ešarra-ḫammat) is known. Esharra-hammat is chiefly known from sources after her death, especially regarding a mausoleum Esarhaddon constructed for her. It is uncertain which of Esarhaddon's many children were hers.

=== Children ===
Esarhaddon had at least 18 children. Some of these children suffered from constant illness, similar to Esarhaddon, and required permanent and constant medical attention by the court physicians. Contemporary letters by Esarhaddon's subjects discussing the king's "numerous children" confirm that his family was viewed as large by ancient Assyrian standards. Those of Esarhaddon's children known by name are the following:

- Serua-eterat (𒊩𒀭𒂔𒂊𒉈𒋥 Šeruʾa-eṭirat) – the eldest of Esarhaddon's daughters and the only one known by name, Serua-eterat was older than Ashurbanipal and might have been the eldest of all of Esarhaddon's children. She held a position of importance in Esarhaddon's court and in the later court of Ashurbanipal, as attested by numerous inscriptions.
- Sin-nadin-apli (𒌍𒋧𒈾𒌉𒍑 or 𒁹𒀭𒌍𒋧𒈾𒀀 Sîn-nadin-apli) – Esarhaddon's eldest son and crown prince from 674 BC until his unexpected death in 672.
- Shamash-shum-ukin (𒌋𒌋𒈬𒁺 Šamaš-šumu-ukin) – Esarhaddon's second eldest son, crown prince and heir to Babylon 672–669 and King of Babylon thereafter.
- Shamash-metu-uballit (𒁹𒀭𒄑𒋓𒂦𒂵𒋾𒆷 Šamaš-metu-uballiṭ) – possibly Esarhaddon's third eldest son. His name, which means "Shamash has brought to life the dead", suggests that he suffered from poor health or had a difficult birth. He was still alive by 672, and his health might be the reason why he was overlooked in favour of his younger brother as heir. It is possible that Shamash-metu-uballit did not accept the succession of Ashurbanipal and paid for it with his life.
- Ashurbanipal (𒀸𒋩𒆕𒀀 Aššur-bāni-apli)) – possibly Essarhadon's fourth eldest son, crown prince and heir to Assyria 672–669 and King of Assyria thereafter.
- Ashur-taqisha-liblut (Aššur-taqiša-libluṭ) – possibly Esarhaddon's fifth eldest son. Thought to have been a sickly child, possibly dead before 672.
- Ashur-mukin-paleya (𒁹𒀭𒊹𒈬𒆥𒁄𒈨𒌍𒐊 Aššur-mukin-paleʾa) – possibly Esarhaddon's sixth eldest son. Probably born after Esarhaddon was already king. Was made a priest in Assur during the reign of Ashurbanipal.
- Ashur-etel-shame-erseti-muballissu (𒁹𒀸𒋩𒈗𒀭𒆠𒋾𒁉 Aššur-etel-šamê-erṣeti-muballissu) – possibly Esarhaddon's seventh eldest son. Probably born after Esarhaddon was already king. Was made a priest in Harran during the reign of Ashurbanipal.
- Ashur-sarrani-muballissu (𒁹𒀸𒋩𒈗𒀀𒉌𒋾𒆷𒁉 Aššur-šarrani-muballissu) – attested only in a single letter, it is possible that Ashur-sarrani-muballissu is identical to Ashur-etel-shame-erseti-muballissu.
- Sin-Peru-ukin (𒁹𒀭𒌍𒉭𒁺𒅔 Sîn-perʾu-ukin) – known from a letter inquiring as to when it was appropriate to visit the king and another letter in which he is described as healthy.

== Legacy ==
=== Assyria after Esarhaddon's death ===
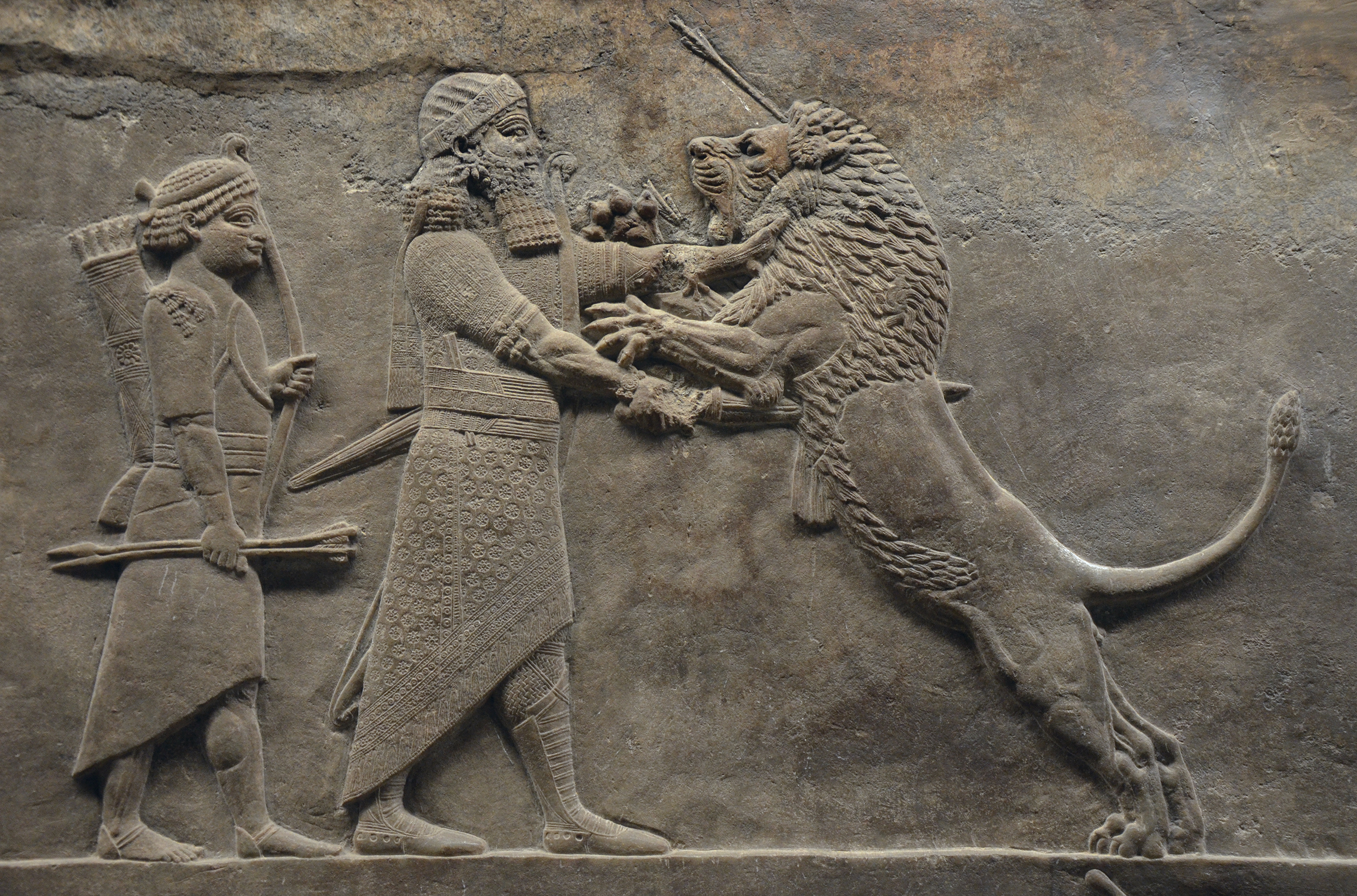
Esarhaddon's successor Ashurbanipal depicted in the Lion Hunt of Ashurbanipal.

After Esarhaddon's death, his son Ashurbanipal became the king of Assyria. After attending his brother's coronation, Shamash-shum-ukin returned the stolen statue of Bel to Babylon and became the king of Babylon. At Babylon, Ashurbanipal sponsored a lavish coronation festival for his brother. Despite his royal title, Shamash-shum-ukin was a vassal to Ashurbanipal; Ashurbanipal continued to offer the royal sacrifices in Babylon (traditionally offered by the Babylonian monarch) and the governors in the south were Assyrians. The army and guards present in the south were also Assyrians. Most of Shamash-shum-ukin's early reign in Babylon was spent peacefully, restoring fortifications and temples.

After he and his brother had been properly inaugurated as monarchs, Ashurbanipal left in 667 BC to complete Esarhaddon's unfinished final campaign against Egypt. In his 667 campaign, Ashurbanipal marched as far south as Thebes, plundering on his way, and upon his victory, he left the joint Pharaohs Psamtik I (who had been educated at Esarhaddon's court) and Necho I as vassal rulers. In 666–665, Ashurbanipal defeated an attempt by Tantamani, nephew of Pharaoh Taharqa, to retake Egypt.

As Shamash-shum-ukin grew stronger, he became increasingly interested in becoming independent of his brother. In 652 Shamash-shum-ukin allied with a coalition of Assyria's enemies, including Elam, Kush and the Chaldeans, and forbade Ashurbanipal from any further sacrifices in any southern city. This led to a civil war that dragged on for four years. By 650, Shamash-shum-ukin's situation looked grim, with Ashubanipal's forces having besieged Sippar, Borsippa, Kutha and Babylon itself. Babylon finally fell in 648 and was plundered by Ashurbanipal. Shamash-shum-ukin died, possibly committing suicide.

Throughout his long reign, Ashurbanipal would campaign against all of Assyria's enemies and rivals. After Ashurbanipal's death, his sons Ashuretillilani and Sinsharishkun retained control of his empire for a time, but during their reigns many of Assyria's vassals seized the opportunity to declare themselves independent. From 627 to 612, the Assyrian Empire effectively disintegrated, and a coalition of Assyrian enemies, chiefly led by the Median Empire and the newly independent Neo-Babylonian Empire, pushed into the Assyrian heartland. In 612, Nineveh itself was plundered and razed. Assyria fell with the defeat of its final king, Ashuruballit II, at Harran in 609.

=== Assessment by historians ===
Esarhaddon, his predecessor Sennacherib and his successor Ashurbanipal are recognized as three of the greatest Assyrian kings. He is typically characterized as gentler and milder than his predecessor, taking greater efforts to pacify and integrate the peoples he conquered. The king has been described as one of the most successful of the Neo-Assyrian rulers on account of his many achievements, including the subjugation of Egypt, the successful and peaceful control of the notoriously rebellious Babylonia and his ambitious construction projects. According to Assyriologist Karen Radner, Esarhaddon emerges more clearly as an individual from available sources than all other Assyrian kings. Most Assyrian kings are known only from their royal inscriptions, but the decade of Esarhaddon's rule is exceptionally well documented because many other documents dating to his reign, such as court correspondence, have survived as well.

Ashurbanipal, who would famously gather ancient Mesopotamian literary works for his famous library, had already begun collecting such works during the reign of Esarhaddon. It is possible that Esarhaddon is to be credited with encouraging Ashurbanipal's collection and education.

== Titles ==
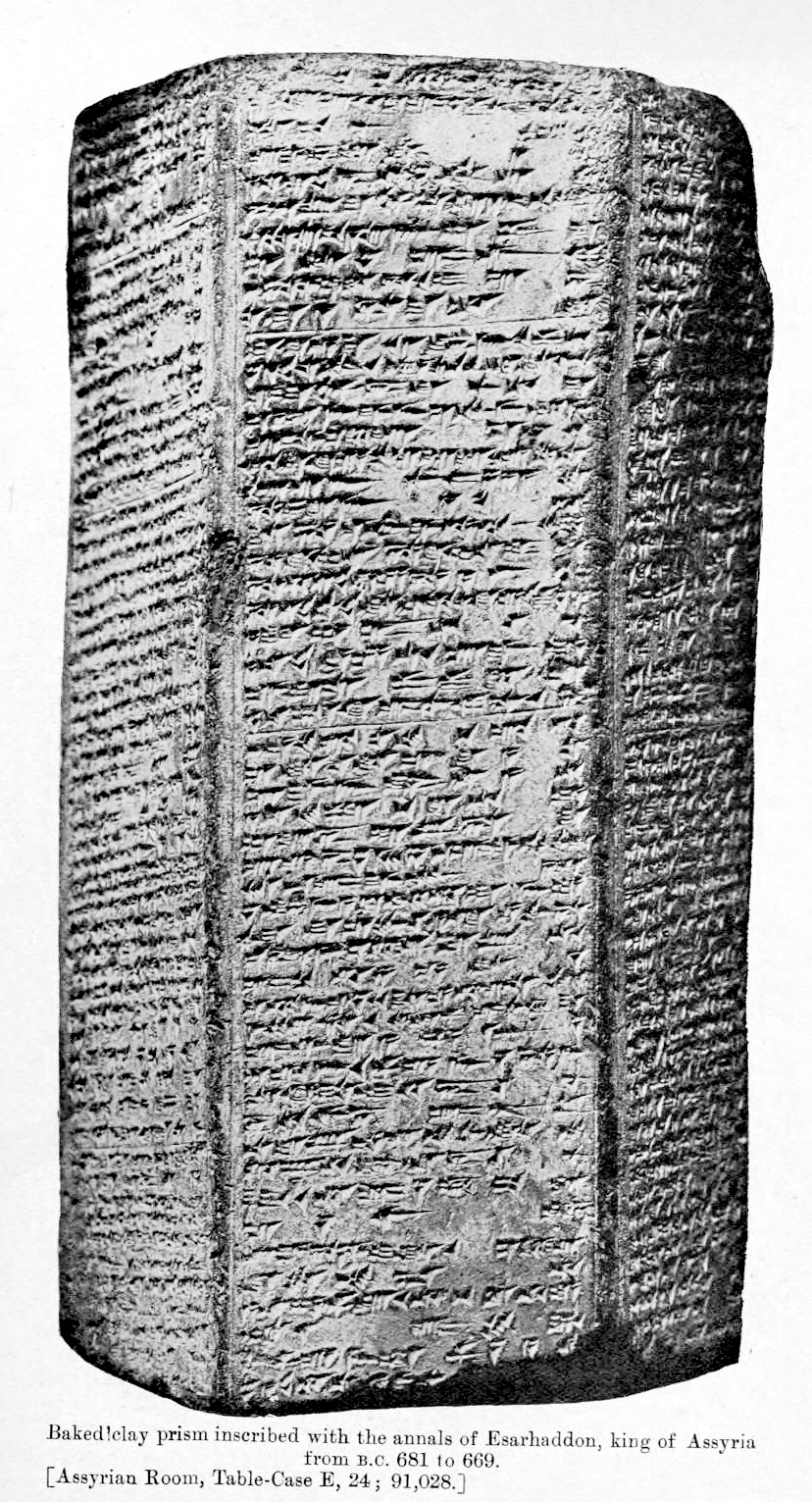
The best preserved of Esarhaddon's cylinders, British Museum BM 91028.

In an inscription describing his appointment as crown prince and his rise to power, Esarhaddon uses the following royal titles:

Esarhaddon, the great king, king of Assyria, viceroy of Babylon, king of Sumer and Akkad, king of the four regions of the earth, favourite of the great gods, his lords. Whom Assur, Marduk and Nabu, Ishtar of Nineveh and Ishtar of Arbela, [missing portion] and whose name they named for the kingship.

In another inscription, the titles of Esarhaddon read as follows:

Esarhaddon, the great king, the mighty king, king of the Universe, king of Assyria, viceroy of Babylon, king of Sumer and Akkad, son of Sennacherib, the great king, the mighty king, king of Assyria, grandson of Sargon, the great king, the mighty king, king of Assyria; who under the protection of Assur, Sin, Shamash, Nabu, Marduk, Ishtar of Nineveh, Ishtar of Arbela, the great gods, his lords, made his way from the rising to the setting sun, having no rival.

A longer version of Esarhaddon's royal titles, and an accompanying boast of his gifts from the gods, preserved in another of his inscriptions, reads:

I am Esarhaddon, king of the Universe, king of Assyria, mighty warrior, first among all princes, son of Sennacherib, king of Assyria, grandson of Sargon, king of the universe, king of Assyria. Creature of Assur and Ninlil, beloved of Sin and Shamash, favorite of Nabu and Marduk, object of Queen Ishtar's affection, heart's desire of the great gods; the powerful, the wise, thoughtful and knowing, whom the great gods have called to kingship for the restoration of the images of the great gods, and the complete rebuilding of the shrines of every metropolis. Builder of the temple of Assur, restorer of Esagila and Babylon, who restored the images of the gods and goddesses dwelling therein, who returned the captive gods of the lands from Assur to their places and caused them to dwell in peaceful habitations, until he had completely restored all the temples and settled the gods in their shrines, to dwell there eternally.
It was I who marched triumphantly, relying on their might, from the rising to the setting sun, and had no rival, who brought in submission at my feet the princes of the four-quarters of the world. Against every land that had rebelled against Assur, they sent me. Assur, father of the gods, commissioned me to cause men to settle down and live in peace, to extend the borders of Assyria. Sin, lord of the tiara – power, manhood, bravery – he made my lot. Shamash, light of the gods, – to my honoured name he brought the highest renown. Marduk, king of the gods, – he made the fear of my rule overwhelm the lands of the four-quarters of the world like a mighty hurricane. Nergal, the almighty among the gods, – fear, terror, awe-inspiring splendour, he granted me as a gift. Ishtar, queen of battle and warfare, – a mighty bow, a monstrous javelin, she gave me as a gift.

== See also ==
- Esarhaddon's Treaty with Ba'al of Tyre (K 3500 + K 4444 + K 10235)
- Esarhaddon's Succession Treaty or Vassal Treaty with Ramataia of Urakazabarna (BM 132548)
- List of Assyrian kings
- Military history of the Neo-Assyrian Empire
- List of biblical figures identified in extra-biblical sources
- Palace of Esarhaddon discovered at Mosul (Nineveh) in 2017 under Tomb of Jonah (Yunus) destroyed by ISIL in 2014
- Sha-Nabu-shu

== Notes ==
Esarhaddon Sargonid dynasty Born: c. 713 BC Died: 1 November 669 BC
Preceded by Sennacherib	King of Assyria; 681 – 669 BC	Succeeded by Ashurbanipal
Preceded by Sennacherib	King of Babylon; 681 – 669 BC	Succeeded by Shamash-shum-ukin
