= Arda-Mulissu =

Assyrian prince

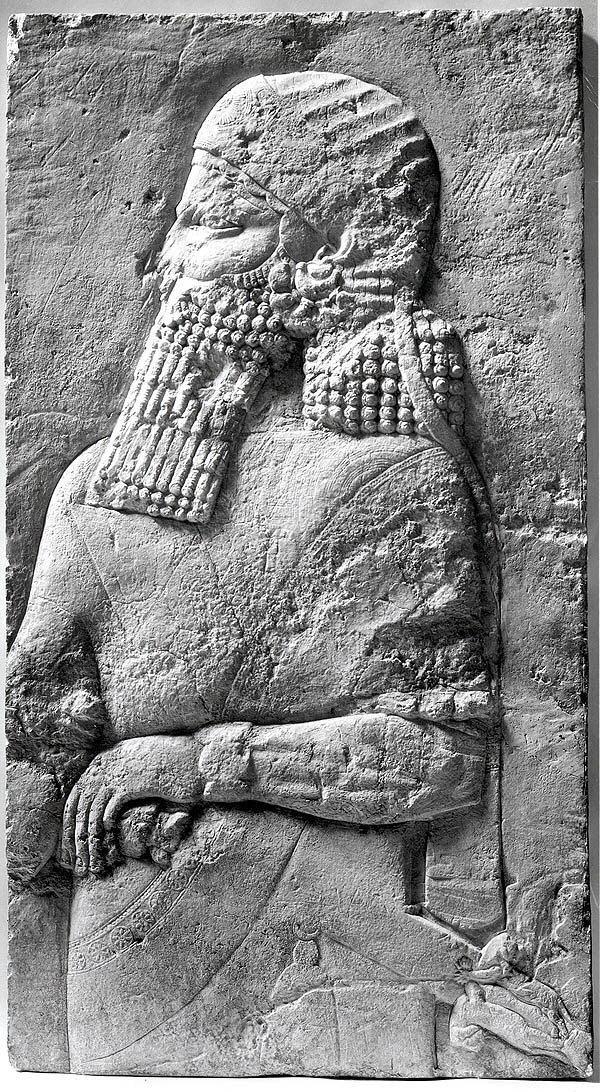
Stele with a depiction of an Assyrian crown prince, dated to Sennacherib's reign. Arda-Mulissu was Sennacherib's longest-serving crown prince but the stele could also depict the earlier Ashur-nadin-shumi or later Esarhaddon.

Arda-Mulissu or Arda-Mulissi (Neo-Assyrian Akkadian: 𒀴𒁹𒎏𒆤, romanized: Arda-Mulišši, lit. 'servant of Mullissu'), also known as Urdu-Mullissi, Urad-Mullissu and Arad-Ninlil and known in Hebrew writings as Adrammelech (Hebrew: אַדְרַמֶּלֶךְ ʾAḏrammeleḵ), was an ancient Assyrian prince of the Sargonid dynasty, the son of Sennacherib, king of the Neo-Assyrian Empire, and the older brother of Sennacherib's successor Esarhaddon. Arda-Mulissu served as Sennacherib's crown prince and heir for ten years, from the time of the death of Sennacherib's first crown prince Ashur-nadin-shumi in 694 BC, but was for unknown reasons replaced as heir by Esarhaddon in 684 BC.

Disappointed by this demotion, Arda-Mulissu was the chief orchestrator of a 681 BC conspiracy in which he and one of his younger brothers, Nabu-shar-usur, murdered Sennacherib in the hopes of seizing the throne. (Note: The overwhelming majority of scholars accept Arad-Mulissu's guilt as a matter of fact. Other hypotheses have at time been proposed, such as that the crime was committed by some unknown Babylonian sympathizer or even by Esarhaddon himself. In 2020, Andrew Knapp suggested that Esarhaddon might actually have been behind the murder, citing alleged inconsistencies in the account of Arad-Mulissu's guilt, that Esarhaddon might also had a difficult relationship with Sennacherib, the speed in which Esarhaddon assembled an army and defeated his brothers, and other circumstantial evidence. However, Christopher W. Jones reviewed the evidence in 2023 and concluded that the conventional view that Arda-Mulissu was the orchestrator of Sennacherib's murder was most likely correct.) Sennacherib's murder turned some of Arda-Mulissu's supporters against him and his coronation was postponed. In the turmoil that followed, Esarhaddon marched on the Assyrian capital of Nineveh and successfully seized the throne. After their failure, Arda-Mulissu and Nabu-shar-usur fled to the Kingdom of Urartu in the north.

== Biography ==
=== Son of Sennacherib ===
Arda-Mulissu was the son of Sennacherib, who reigned as king of the Neo-Assyrian Empire from 705 BC to 681 BC. Sennacherib had more than one wife, and Arda-Mulissu's mother is not known but it is certain that she was not Naqi'a, the mother of Arda-Mulissu's younger half-brother Esarhaddon. In 700 BC, Sennacherib had appointed his eldest son, Ashur-nadin-shumi, as the crown prince (designated heir) and gave him rule of Babylonia, which covered the southern Mesopotamian provinces of his empire. Shortly after this appointment, Sennacherib campaigned against Elam (modern day southern Iran) to chase after Chaldean rebels which had fled there. In response to this incursion into their territory, the Elamites invaded the southern parts of the Neo-Assyrian Empire and in 694 BC successfully captured Ashur-nadin-shumi at the city of Sippar. The prince was taken to Elam and probably executed.

Needing to appoint a new heir from among his sons, Sennacherib then elevated his second eldest surviving son, Arda-Mulissu, as crown prince. Assyriologists Simo Parpola and Theodore Kwasman have also suggested an alternative hypothesis, that Ashur-nadin-shumi was intended to succeed Sennacherib only in Babylonia and that Arda-Mulissu could have been appointed significantly earlier, perhaps already in 698 BC. There are no known documents that describe Arda-Mulissu as crown prince prior to 694 BC, the year in which Ashur-nadin-shumi was captured and presumably executed.

Kwasman and Parpola also suggested that Sennacherib might have appointed another son, Nergal-shumu-ibni, as crown prince of Babylonia after Ashur-nadin-shumi's death. Nergal-shumu-ibni would then have served as crown prince of Babylonia while Arda-Mulissu was crown prince of Assyria. There are no surviving documents to affirm such an appointment, but Kwasman and Parpola based their hypothesis on a series of contracts, dated to 694 and 693 BC, which title Nergal-shumu-ibni as mār šarri. Mār šarri literally means "son of the king", a correct identification in this case, but was commonly employed as a title only applied to the crown prince.

Although Arda-Mulissu held the position of heir apparent for at least ten years, he was replaced by Esarhaddon in 684 BC. The reason for Arda-Mulissu's sudden dismissal from the position is unknown, but it is clear from contemporary texts that he was very disappointed. Despite his dismissal, Arda-Mulissu remained popular and some vassals secretly supported him as the heir to throne. Esarhaddon's own texts confirm that the dismissal of an older son as heir in favour of a younger one was an extraordinary decision, writing "Although I was younger than my big brothers, my father and begetter, by command of the gods, justly preferred me to my other brothers, saying: ‘This is my heir’".

=== Attempted coup ===
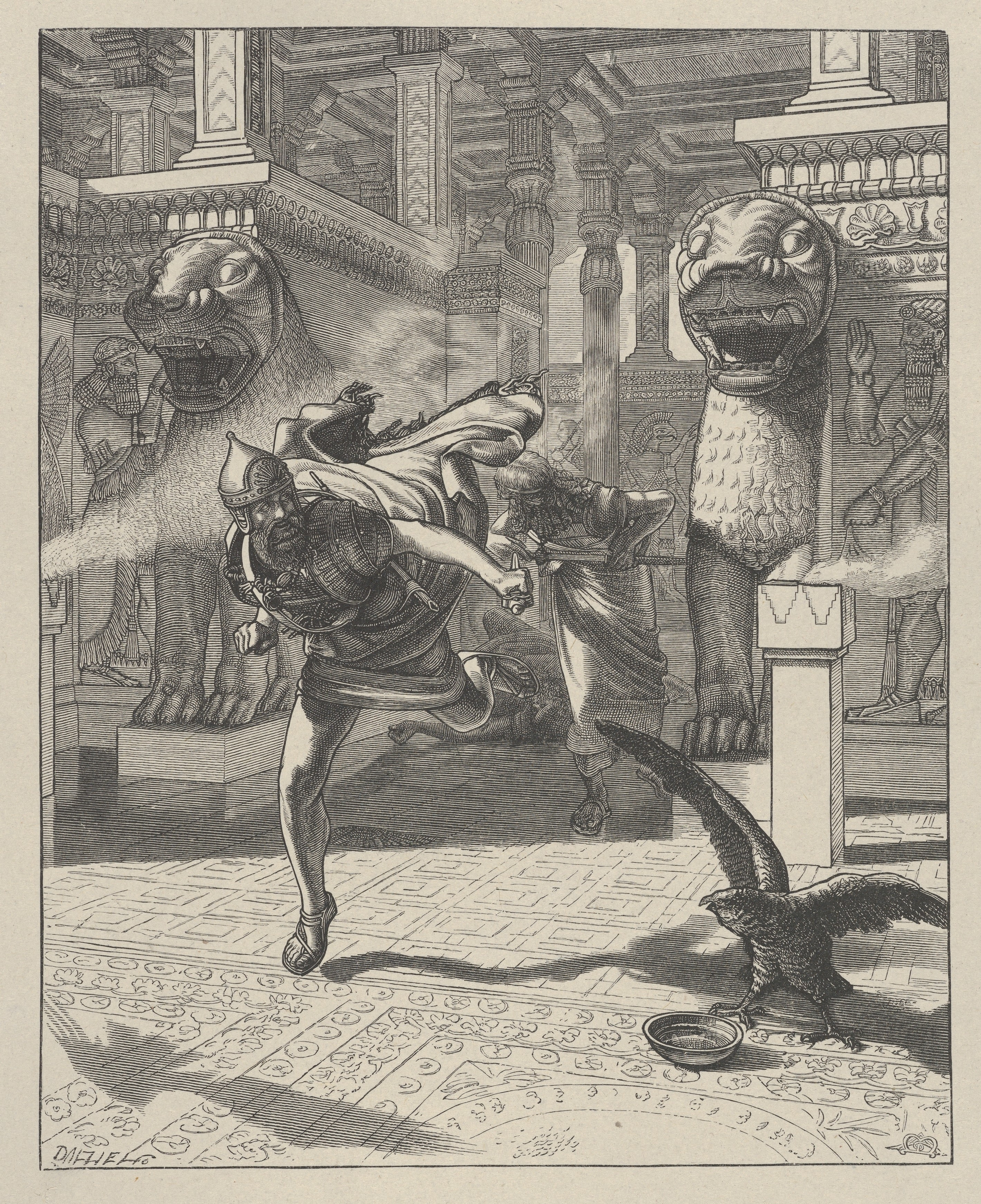
The Flight of Adrammelech, illustration from Dalziel's Bible Gallery (1881), depicting Arda-Mulissu and Nabu-shar-usur escaping after murdering Sennacherib.

Arda-Mulissu was forced to swear loyalty to Esarhaddon by his father, but repeatedly tried to appeal Sennacherib to again accept him as heir instead. Sennacherib noted the increasing popularity of Arda-Mulissu and came to fear for his designated successor, so sent Esarhaddon away to the western provinces. This exile of Esarhaddon put Arda-Mulissu in a difficult position as he had reached the height of his popularity but was powerless to act with Esarhaddon away. In order to use the opportunity, Arda-Mulissu decided that he needed to act quickly and take the throne by force.

Arda-Mulissu concluded a "treaty of rebellion" with another of his younger brothers, Nabu-shar-usur (also known as Sharezer), and on 20 October 681 BC, they attacked and killed their father in one of Nineveh's (the capital of Assyria during their time) temples. Despite their conspiracy succeeding, Arda-Mulissu could not successfully seize the throne. The murder of the king caused some resentment against Arda-Mulissu by his own supporters which delayed his potential coronation. In the meantime, Esarhaddon had raised an army. The army raised by Arda-Mulissu and Nabu-shar-usur met Esarhaddon's forces in Hanigalbat, a region in the western parts of the empire. There, most of their soldiers deserted and joined Esarhaddon, who then marched on Nineveh without opposition.

Arda-Mulissu and Nabu-shar-usur fled north, probably first to the mountain kingdom of Shupria, before moving on to the Kingdom of Urartu, an old rival of Assyria. Esarhaddon successfully took the throne six weeks after Sennacherib's death. He then executed all conspirators and political enemies he could get his hands on, including the families of Arda-Mulissu and Nabu-shar-usur. Arda-Mulissu and Nabu-shar-usur continued to live as exiles in Urartu for several years. Some texts suggest that they were alive and free in Urartu as late as 673 BC. Esarhaddon conducted a northern campaign in that year, attacking Shupria, but failed to capture his brothers, likely the primary objective of the expedition.

== Legacy ==
The murder of Sennacherib, ruler of the mightiest empire on the planet at his time, was shocking to his contemporaries and was received with strong emotion and mixed feelings throughout Mesopotamia and the rest of the Ancient Near East. In the Levant and in Babylonia the news was celebrated and proclaimed as divine punishment due to Sennacherib's brutal campaigns against these regions while in Assyria, the reaction was probably resentment and horror. The event was recorded in numerous sources and is even mentioned in the Bible (2 Kings 19:37; Isaiah 37:38), wherein Arda-Mulissu is called Adrammelech.

A fictive account by the medieval Armenian historian Movses Khorenatsi (5th century AD) claims that Arda-Mulissu's descendants in Urartu became the Artsruni and Gnuni noble houses and that Nabu-shar-usur was made Bidaxsh.
