= Sha-Nabu-shu =

Sha-Nabu-shu was the chief eunuch of Esarhaddon of Assyria and was responsible for the conclusive defeat of Taharqa at Memphis, subsequent to being ordered to do so with the aide of a small, yet well-trained, army by the Assyrian King, Ashurbanipal.
