= Ashurbanipal =

King of the Neo-Assyrian Empire, 669–631 BC

- King of Assyria; King of Sumer and Akkad; King of the Lands; King of the Four Corners of the World; King of the Universe
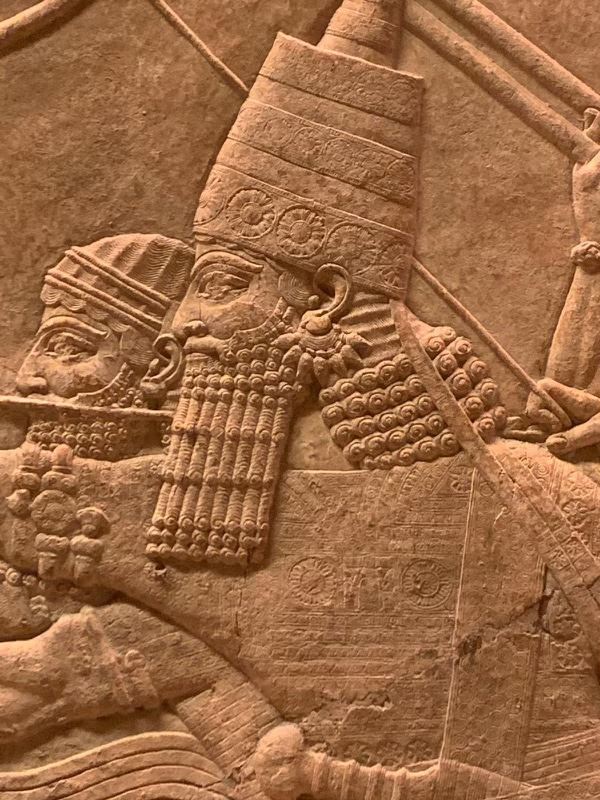
- Ashurbanipal, closeup from the Lion Hunt of Ashurbanipal

King of the Neo-Assyrian Empire
- Reign: 669–631 BC
- Predecessor: Esarhaddon
- Successor: Ashur-etil-ilani
- Born: c. 685 BC; Neo-Assyrian Empire
- Died: 631 BC (aged c. 53/54); Neo-Assyrian Empire
- Spouse: Libbali-sharrat
- Issue: Ashur-etil-ilani; Sinsharishkun; Ninurta-sharru-usur
- Akkadian: Aššur-bāni-apli
- Dynasty: Sargonid dynasty
- Father: Esarhaddon
- Mother: Esharra-hammat (?)

Ashurbanipal (Note: He is sometimes erroneously enumerated as Ashurbanipal II, out of confusion with the earlier Ashurnasirpal II, or as Ashurbanipal III, in succession to him (despite the two kings having different names). His name is also sometimes alternatively transliterated as Assurbanipal. In Aramaic, Ashurbanipal was called Osnappar (Imperial Aramaic: אָסְנַפַּר, romanized: ’Āsnappar).) (Neo-Assyrian Akkadian: 𒀸𒋩𒆕𒀀, romanized: Aššur-bāni-apli, (Note: His name was sometimes transliterated as Aššur-bāni-habal or Aššur-bāni-pal (from which the modern rendition "Ashurbanipal" derives) in 19th-century works.) meaning "Ashur is the creator of the heir") was the king of the Neo-Assyrian Empire from 669 BC to his death in 631. He is generally remembered as the last great king of Assyria. Ashurbanipal inherited the throne as his father Esarhaddon‘s favored heir; his 38-year reign was among the longest of any Assyrian king. (Note: Only six Assyrian kings ruled longer than Ashurbanipal: the Early Assyrian kings Erishum I (40 years), Sargon I (40 years) and Naram-Sin (54/44 years) and the Middle Assyrian kings Ashur-dan I (46 years), Tiglath-Pileser I (39 years) and Ashur-rabi II (41 years).) Though sometimes regarded as the apogee of ancient Assyria, his reign also marked the last time Assyrian armies waged war throughout the ancient Near East and the beginning of the end of Assyrian dominion over the region.

Esarhaddon selected Ashurbanipal as heir c. 673. The selection of Ashurbanipal bypassed the elder son Shamash-shum-ukin. Perhaps in order to avoid future rivalry, Esarhaddon designated Shamash-shum-ukin as the heir to Babylonia. The two brothers jointly ascended to their respective thrones after Esarhaddon's death in 669, though Shamash-shum-ukin was relegated to being Ashurbanipal's closely monitored vassal. Much of the early years of Ashurbanipal's reign was spent fighting rebellions in Egypt, which had been conquered by his father. The most extensive campaigns of Ashurbanipal were those directed towards Elam, an ancient enemy of Assyria, and against Shamash-shum-ukin, who gradually began to resent the overbearing control that his younger brother held over him. Elam was defeated in a series of conflicts in 665, 653 and 647–646. Shamash-shum-ukin rebelled in 652 and assembled a coalition of Assyria's enemies but was defeated and died during Ashurbanipal's siege of Babylon in 648. On account of a lack of surviving records, much of Ashurbanipal's late reign is poorly known.

Ashurbanipal is chiefly remembered today for his cultural efforts. A patron of artwork and literature, Ashurbanipal was deeply interested in the ancient literary culture of Mesopotamia. Over the course of his long reign, Ashurbanipal utilized the massive resources at his disposal to construct the Library of Ashurbanipal, a collection of texts and documents of various different genres. Perhaps comprising over 100,000 texts at its height, the Library of Ashurbanipal was not surpassed until the construction of the Library of Alexandria, several centuries later. The more than 30,000 cuneiform texts that have survived from the library are a highly important source on ancient Mesopotamian language, religion, literature and science. Artwork produced under Ashurbanipal was innovative in style and motifs and is regarded to possess an "epic quality" otherwise absent from much of the art produced under previous kings.

Ashurbanipal is recognized as one of the most brutal Assyrian kings; he was one of the few rulers to boast of his gory massacres of rebellious civilians. His extensive destruction of Elam has been described as a genocide. The Assyrians won many battles under Ashurbanipal, campaigning further from the Assyrian heartland than ever before, but several of his campaigns achieved little strategic advantage. Ashurbanipal failed to maintain control of Egypt, and his wars in Arabia cost time and resources without establishing longterm Assyrian control. His extensive sack of Babylon after defeating Shamash-shum-ukin weakened the resources of the empire and fanned anti-Assyrian sentiment in southern Mesopotamia, perhaps contributing to the rise of the Neo-Babylonian Empire five years after Ashurbanipal's death. Whether Ashurbanipal's policies led to the fall of the Assyrian Empire only two decades after his death is disputed in modern Assyriology.

A distorted legend of Ashurbanipal was remembered in Greco-Roman literary tradition under the name Sardanapalus, purportedly the effeminate and decadent last king of Assyria whose vices led to the fall of his empire.

== Background and accession ==
=== Becoming the heir to Assyria ===
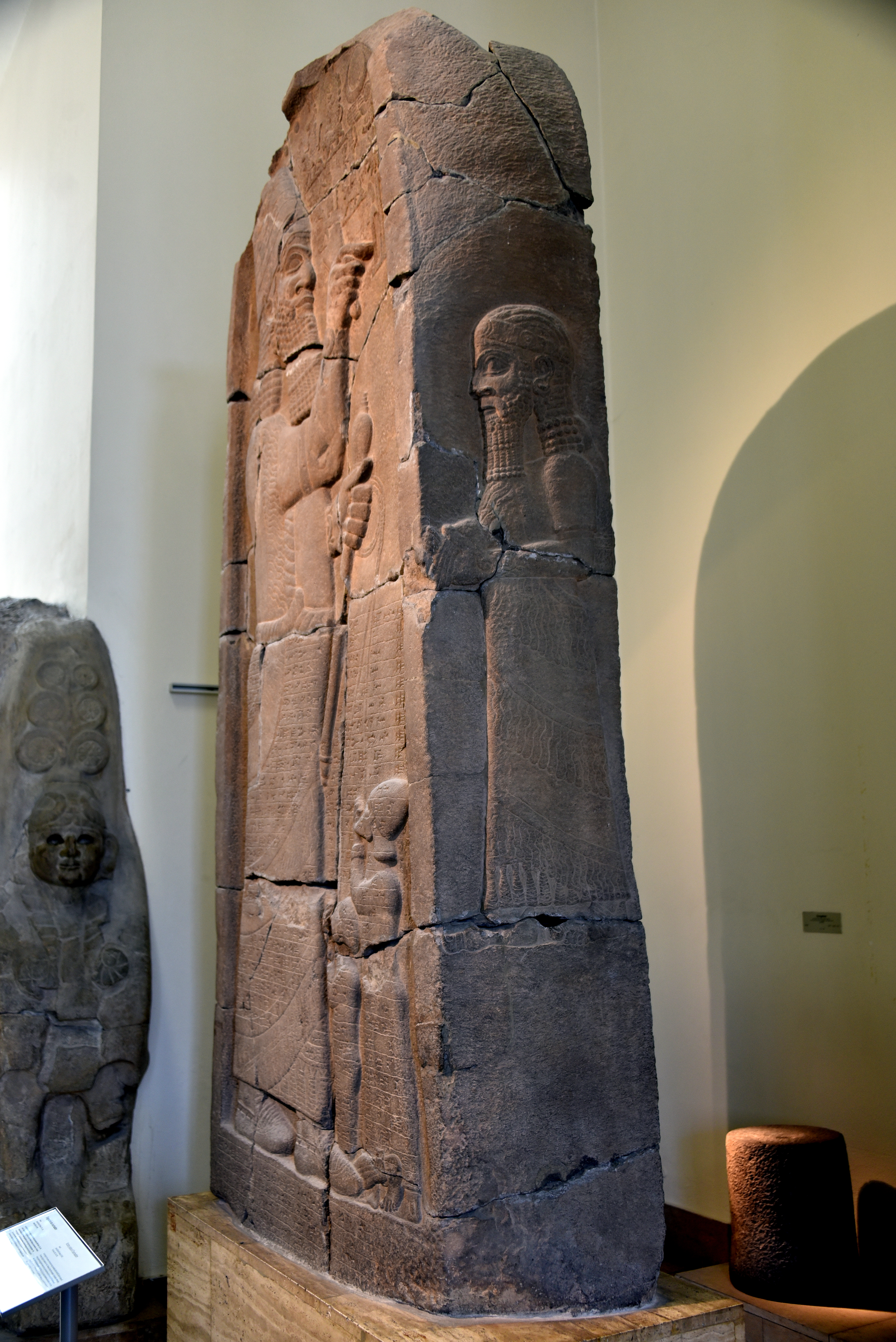
The victory stele of Esarhaddon, Ashurbanipal's father. The front side depicts Esarhaddon and the sides depict the two crown princes Ashurbanipal (on the side shown here) and Shamash-shum-ukin (on the opposite side), Pergamon Museum.

Born c. 685 BC, Ashurbanipal succeeded his father Esarhaddon (r. 681–669). Though Ashurbanipal's inscriptions suggest that he was divinely preordained to rule, his accession was far from straightforward, and its political complexities sowed the seeds for later civil war. Ashurbanipal was probably Esarhaddon's fourth eldest son, younger than Esarhaddon's first crown prince Sin-nadin-apli and the other two sons Shamash-shum-ukin and Shamash-metu-uballit. He also had an older sister, Serua-eterat, and several younger brothers.

The Assyrian court was thrown into upheaval upon the unexpected death of Sin-nadin-apli in 674. Esarhaddon's own father Sennacherib had bypassed Esarhaddon's elder brother Arda-Mulissu for the crown, and the rejected heir had murdered Sennacherib, with Esarhaddon winning the ensuing civil war. After the death of his own heir, Esarhaddon quickly made new succession plans, naming his younger son Ashurbanipal as primary heir and emperor of Assyria, and his eldest surviving son Shamash-shum-ukin as king of Babylon (southern Mesopotamia), with the two to rule as "equal brothers". He entirely bypassed his third eldest son, Shamash-metu-uballit, older than Ashurbanipal, perhaps because of poor health.

Scholars have speculated at Esarhaddon's reasons for the divided succession, which broke with the Assyrian tradition of unitary rule. The arrangement might have been intended to assuage the elder Shamash-shum-ukin's jealousy toward his younger brother Ashurbanipal, avoiding future rivalry. One hypothesis is that Ashurbanipal's mother was Assyrian while Shamash-shum-ukin's was Babylonian, which might have disfavored him for the Assyrian throne. However, it is equally likely that the two heirs shared a mother, possibly Esharra-hammat (Esarhaddon's primary consort).

The two princes arrived at the Assyrian capital of Nineveh together and partook in a celebration in May 672 with foreign representatives, Assyrian nobles and military commanders. Since the name Ashurbanipal (Aššur-bāni-apli) means "Ashur is the creator of the heir", it was likely bestowed at this time, while his previous name is unknown. It was also perhaps around this time that Ashurbanipal married his future queen, Libbali-sharrat.

=== Crown prince and accession ===
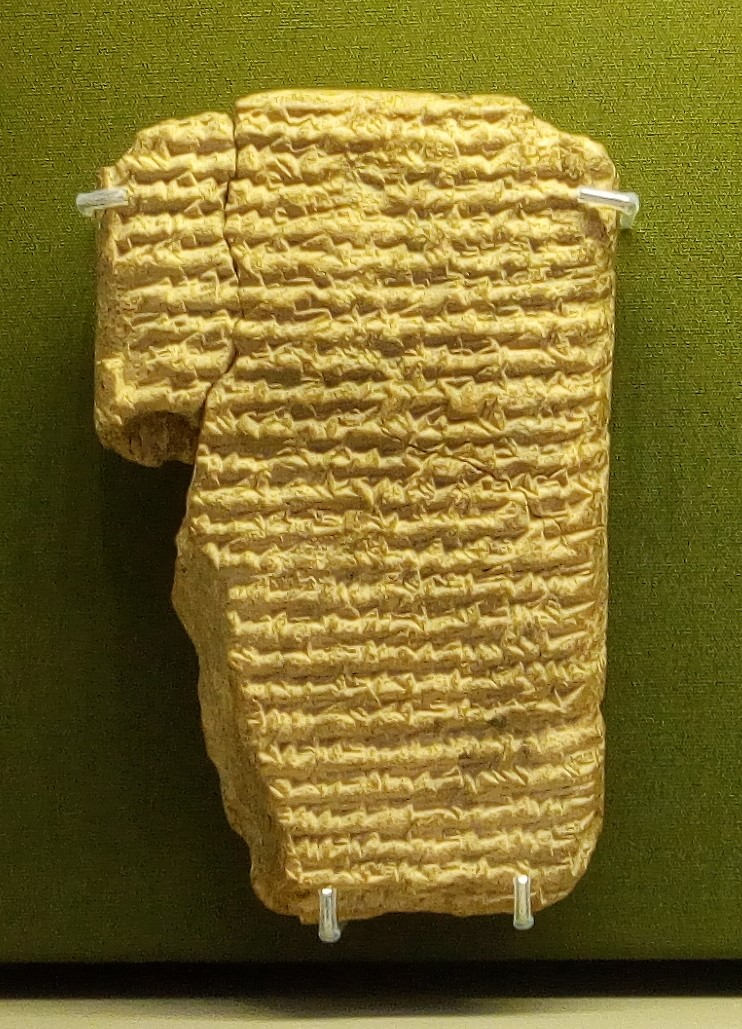
A copy of the Zakutu Treaty, drawn up by Ashurbanipal's grandmother Naqi'a in 669 BC, imploring the populace of Assyria to swear loyalty to Ashurbanipal.

Ashurbanipal entered the "House of Succession", the palace of the crown prince. He began training for his duties as ruler, learning hunting, riding, scholarship and wisdom, archery, chariotry, and other military arts. Because his father Esarhaddon was constantly ill during his last few years, much of the administration of the empire fell upon Ashurbanipal and Shamash-shum-ukin. Letters between the two heirs from this time show that Ashurbanipal managed the empire's intelligence network, gathering strategic information from abroad and compiling reports for his father.

Ashurbanipal became king of Assyria in late 669 following Esarhaddon's death, having been crown prince for only three years. He mounted to what may have been the most powerful throne on Earth, but his sovereignty may not have been secure. His grandmother Naqi'a wrote the Zakutu Treaty, which bound the royal family, aristocracy, and all Assyria to swear loyalty to Ashurbanipal. There however appears to have been no strong opposition to Ashurbanipal's rise to power. Shamash-shum-ukin was somewhat belatedly crowned king of Babylon in the spring of the next year. His coronation was marked by Ashurbanipal's gift of the sacred Statue of Marduk, stolen from Babylon by Sennacherib twenty years before. Shamash-shum-ukin would rule Babylon for sixteen years, apparently without open conflict with his younger brother, but there would be repeated disagreements on the extent of his independence.

Esarhaddon's succession decrees equivocated on the balance of power between the two heirs. Ashurbanipal was the primary heir to the empire, and Shamash-shum-ukin was to swear allegiance to him, but Ashurbanipal was not to interfere in Shamash-shum-ukin's affairs. Ashurbanipal shifted the balance of power in his own favor, perhaps fearing that true independence would give his older brother the means to threaten his rule.

== Military campaigns ==
=== Egyptian campaigns ===
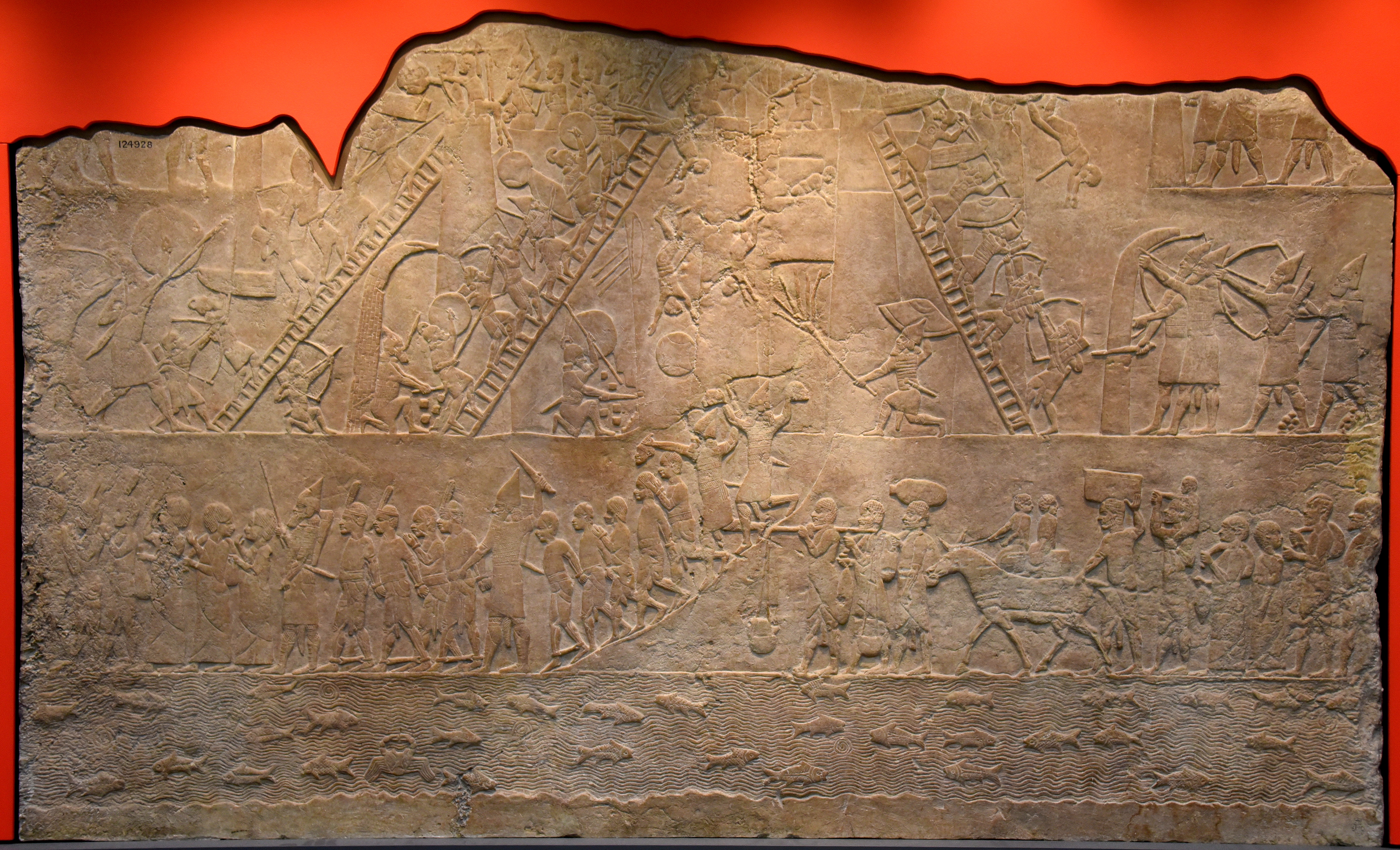
Relief depicting Ashurbanipal's army attacking an Kushite fortified city, possibly Memphis, during the Assyrian conquest of Egypt.

In 671 Ashurbanipal's father Esarhaddon conquered Egypt, defeating the Kushite Pharaoh Taharqa, the first time Egypt had been under Assyrian rule. It was Esarhaddon's greatest triumph and brought the Assyrian Empire to its greatest extent. Assyrian control of Egypt was weak, however, as Taharqa retreated south to Nubia and schemed to retake his lands. Esarhaddon sent troops to garrison Egyptian cities and appointed local Egyptian nobles as vassal rulers of the country. In 669, Taharqa led Egypt in a revolt against Assyria, and Esarhaddon left Nineveh to meet the threat, but fell ill and died on the way. The campaign lapsed while Ashurbanipal was succeeding to his father's throne, and many of the Egyptian vassal rulers joined the revolt to expel the foreign conquerors. After they massacred the Assyrian garrison in Memphis, Ashurbanipal sent an army against the rebels.

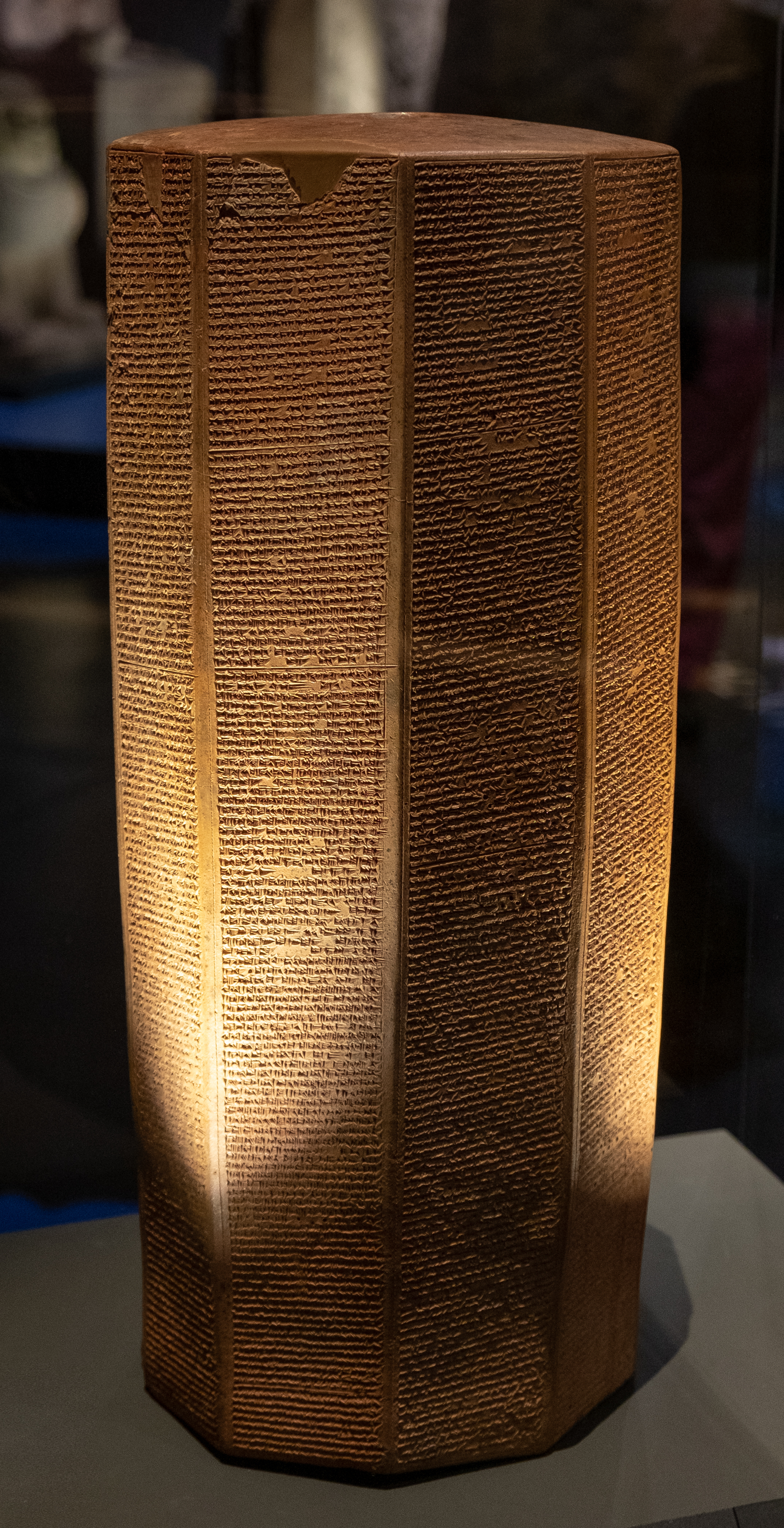
The Rassam cylinder of Ashurbanipal, the most complete chronicle of his reign, includes a description of the campaign of Egypt. Nineveh, 643 BCE. British Museum.

On their way to Egypt, the Assyrian army collected tribute and military reinforcements from the various Levantine vassal states, including Manasseh of Judah and various rulers from Cyprus. The expeditionary forces fought their way through Egypt, winning a decisive battle at Kar-Banitu in Lower Egypt. According to Assyrian sources, Taharqa and his supporters fled from Memphis to Thebes, then escaped back to Nubia, and the Assyrian army re-occupied Memphis. Some conspirators who had remained at Memphis, including the local vassal ruler Necho I, were taken back to Assyria, and after swearing new oaths of loyalty were unexpectedly allowed to return and resume their posts in Egypt.

After Taharqa's death in 664, his nephew Tantamani proclaimed himself pharaoh and invaded Egypt, swiftly gained control of Thebes, and marched on Memphis. Ashurbanipal once again sent the Assyrian army. By Ashurbanipal's account, Tantamani fled south as soon as the Assyrian army entered Egypt. In retaliation for the repeated rebellion, the Assyrians heavily plundered Thebes. The sacking was the most serious calamity ever to befall the ancient city, one of the major political and religious centers in Egypt. The city might have been razed to the ground but for the skillful diplomacy of its governor Mentuemhat. Tantamani was not pursued beyond the Egyptian border. Upon the return of the Assyrian army to Nineveh, spoils from Thebes were paraded through the streets and many treasures and obelisks were refashioned to incorporate into for Ashurbanipal's projects.

=== Initial Elamite conflicts ===
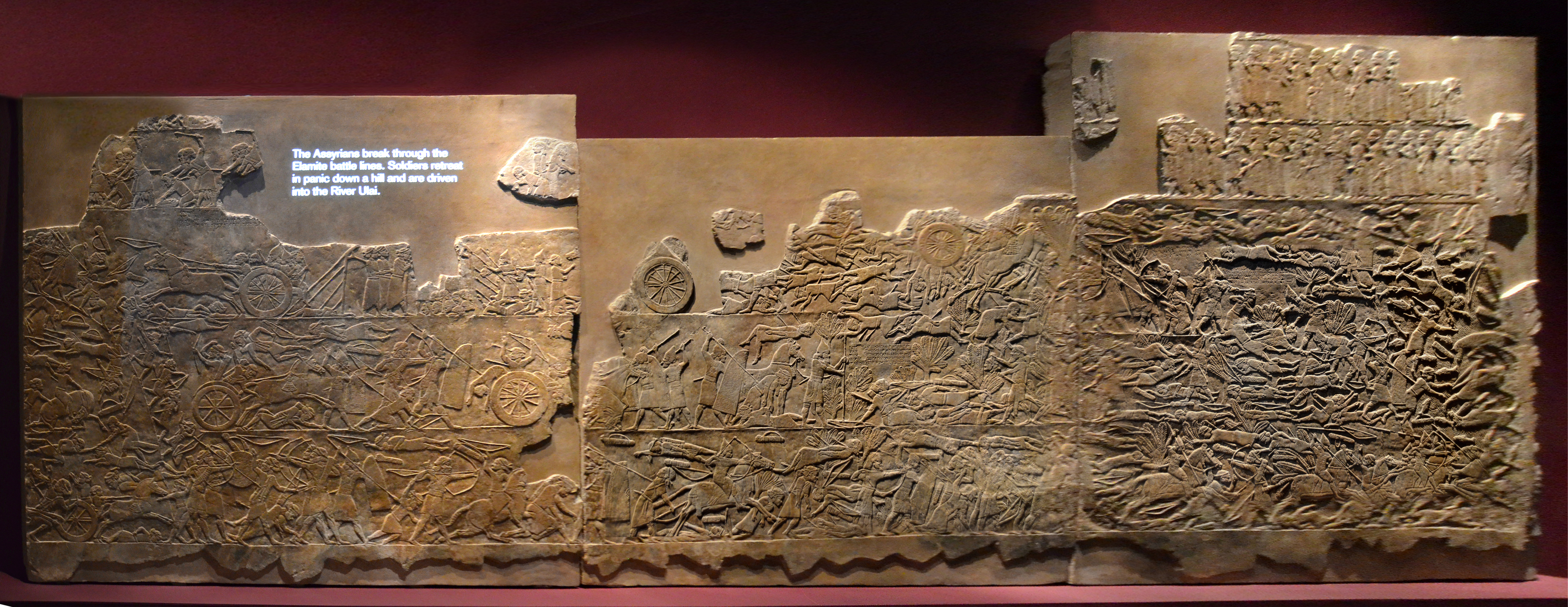
Set of reliefs depicting the 653 BCE Battle of Ulai, between the Assyrians and the Elamite king Teumman.

In 665, the Elamite king Urtak, who had kept peaceful relations with Esarhaddon, launched a surprise attack against Babylonia. Urtak was successfully driven back into Elam, dying shortly thereafter. He was succeeded as Elamite king by Teumman, who was unrelated to the previous monarch and had to stabilize his rule by killing his political rivals. Three of Urtak's sons, chief rival claimants to the Elamite throne, escaped to Assyria and were harbored by Ashurbanipal, despite Teumman demanding them to be returned to Elam.

Following the 665 victory over the Elamites, Ashurbanipal had to deal with a series of revolts within his own borders. Bel-iqisha, chieftain of the Gambulians (an Aramean tribe) in Babylonia, rebelled after he had been implicated as supporting the Elamite invasion and was forced to relinquish some of his authority. Little is known of this revolt, but there is a letter preserved in which Ashurbanipal orders the governor of Uruk, Nabu-usabsi, (Note: Nabu-usabsi was the uncle of the later Babylonian rebel Nabopolassar, who in the 610s BCE defeated and destroyed the Assyrian Empire.) to attack Bel-iqisha. Nabu-usabsi apparently claimed that Bel-iqisha was solely to blame for the Elamite invasion. Bel-iqisha's revolt does not appear to have caused much damage and he was killed shortly after revolting by a boar. Shortly thereafter in 663, Bel-iqisha's son Dunanu also surrendered to Ashurbanipal.

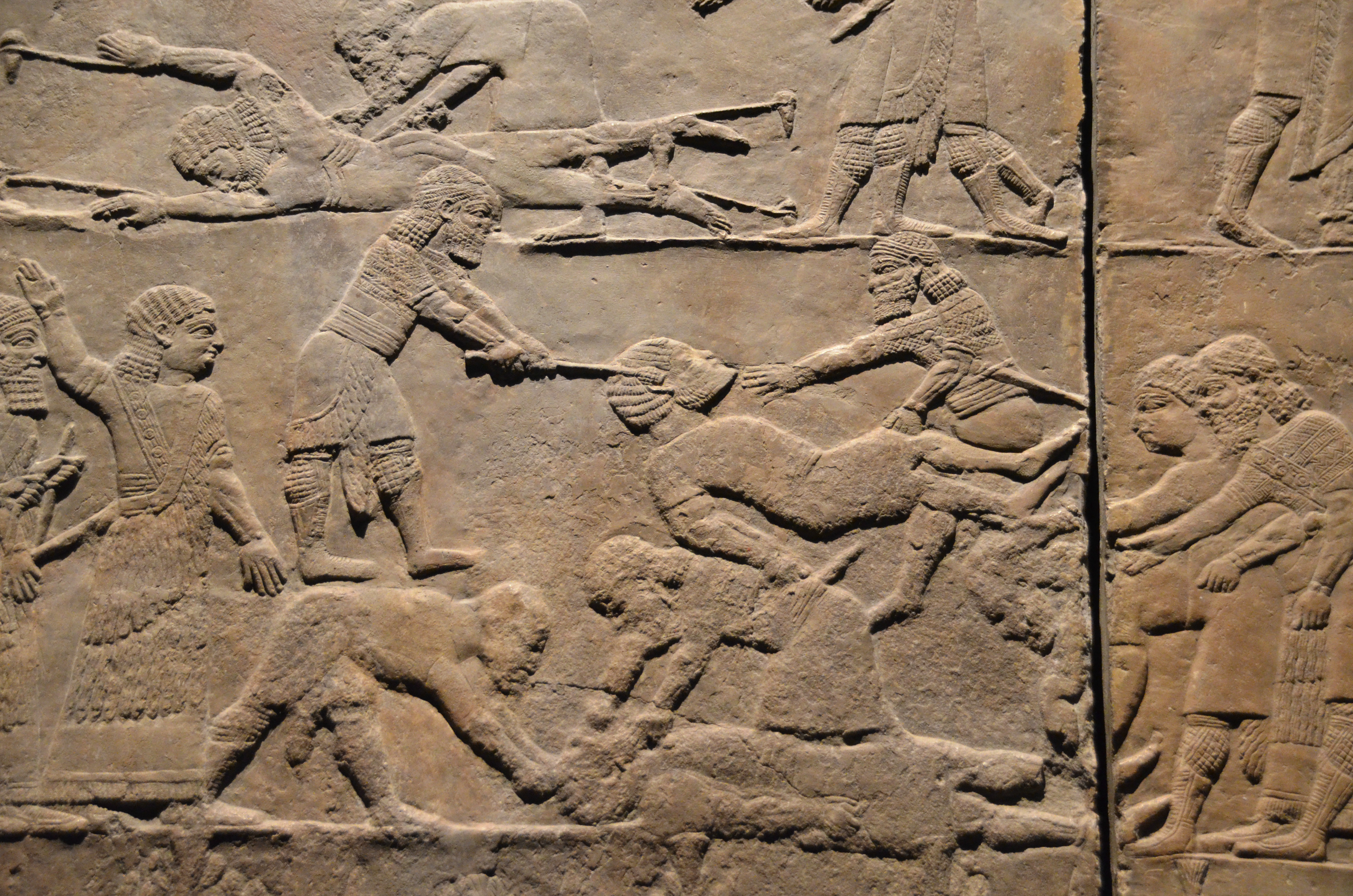
Relief depicting tongue removal and live flaying of Elamite chiefs after the Battle of Ulai.

After a long period of peace, Teumman attacked Babylonia in 653. Because Ashurbanipal had not entrusted Shamash-shum-ukin with any substantial military forces, he was unable to defend Babylonia against the Elamite invasion and the latter had to rely on Ashurbanipal for military support. Ashurbanipal's army first advanced south and secured the city of Der. Though Teumman marched to meet the Assyrians, he soon changed his mind and fell back to the Elamite capital of Susa. The final battle in the war with Teumman, the Battle of Ulai, took place near Susa and was a decisive Assyrian victory, partly due to defections in the Elamite army. Teumann was killed in the battle, as was one of his vassals, Shutruk-Nahhunte of Hidalu. In the aftermath of his victory, Ashurbanipal installed two of Urtak's sons as rulers, proclaiming Ummanigash as king at Madaktu and Susa and Tammaritu I as king at Hidalu. This intervention into the Elamite succession weakened both Elamite opposition towards Assyria and Elamite royal authority. In his inscriptions, Ashurbanipal described his victory at Ulai with the following account:

Like the onset of a terrible hurricane I overwhelmed Elam in its entirety. I cut off the head of Teumann, their king, – the haughty one, who plotted evil. Countless of his warriors I slew. Alive, with my hands, I seized his fighters. With their corpses I filled the plain about Susa as with baltu and ashagu. (Note: Baltu and ashagu were probably varieties of thorny shrub.) Their blood I let run down the Ulai; its water I dyed red like wool.

Dunanu, who had joined the Elamites in the war, was captured alongside his family and executed. The Gambulians were attacked by Ashurbanipal's army and brutally punished, with their capital of Shapibel being flooded and many of its inhabitants slaughtered. In Dananu's stead, Ashurbanipal appointed a noble called Rimutu as the new Gambulian chieftain after he had agreed to pay a considerable sum in tribute to the Assyrian king.

=== Diplomacy and incursions into Assyria ===
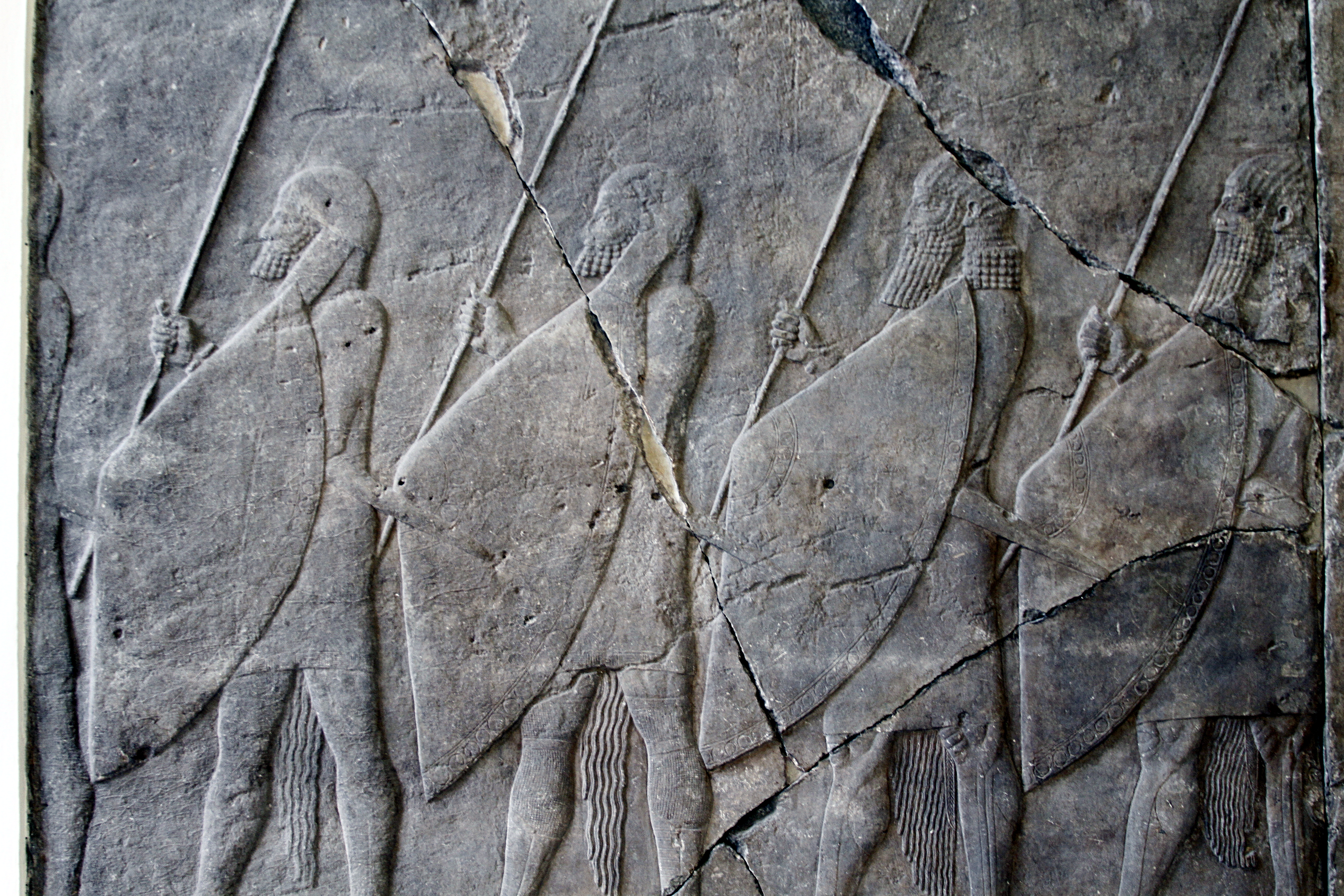
Assyrian spearmen depicted in a palace relief from Nineveh, 7th century BC.

The Cimmerians, a nomadic Indo-European people living in the southern Caucasus directly northeast of Assyria, had invaded Assyria during the reign of Ashurbanipal's father. After Esarhaddon defeated them, the Cimmerians turned to attack Lydia in western Anatolia, ruled by Gyges. After allegedly receiving advice from the Assyrian national deity Ashur in a dream, Gyges sent his diplomats to ask Ashurbanipal for assistance. The Assyrians did not even know that Lydia existed; after the two states successfully established communication with the help of interpreters, the Cimmerian invasion of Lydia was defeated c. 665. Two Cimmerian chiefs were imprisoned in Nineveh and large amounts of spoils were secured by Ashurbanipal's forces. The extent to which the Assyrian army was involved in the Lydian campaign is unknown, but it appears that Gyges was disappointed with the help since he just twelve years later broke his alliance with Ashurbanipal and allied with the increasingly independent Egypt instead. After this, Ashurbanipal cursed Gyges. When Lydia was overrun by its enemies c. 652–650 there was much rejoicing in Assyria.

While the Assyrian forces were on campaign in Elam, an alliance of Persians, Cimmerians and Medes marched on Nineveh and managed to reach the city's walls. To counteract this threat, Ashurbanipal called on Assyria´s longtime ally, the Indo-Aryan (Iranic) Scythian allies, and the Assyrians and Scythians successfully defeated the enemy army. The Median king, Phraortes, is generally held to have been killed in the fighting. This attack is poorly documented and it is possible that Phraortes was not present at all and his unfortunate death instead belongs to a Median campaign during the reign of one of Ashurbanipal's successors.

After his death c. 652, Gyges was succeeded by his son Ardys. Because the Scythians had driven the Cimmerians from their homes, the Cimmerians invaded Lydia again and successfully captured of the kingdom. As his father had before him, Ardys also sent for aid from Ashurbanipal, stating that "You cursed my father and bad luck befell him; but bless me, your humble servant, and I will carry your yoke". It is unknown if any Assyrian aid arrived, but Lydia was successfully freed from the Cimmerians. They would not be driven out of Lydia completely until the reign of Ardys's grandson Alyattes.

=== Civil war with Shamash-shum-ukin ===
==== Rising tensions and rebellion ====
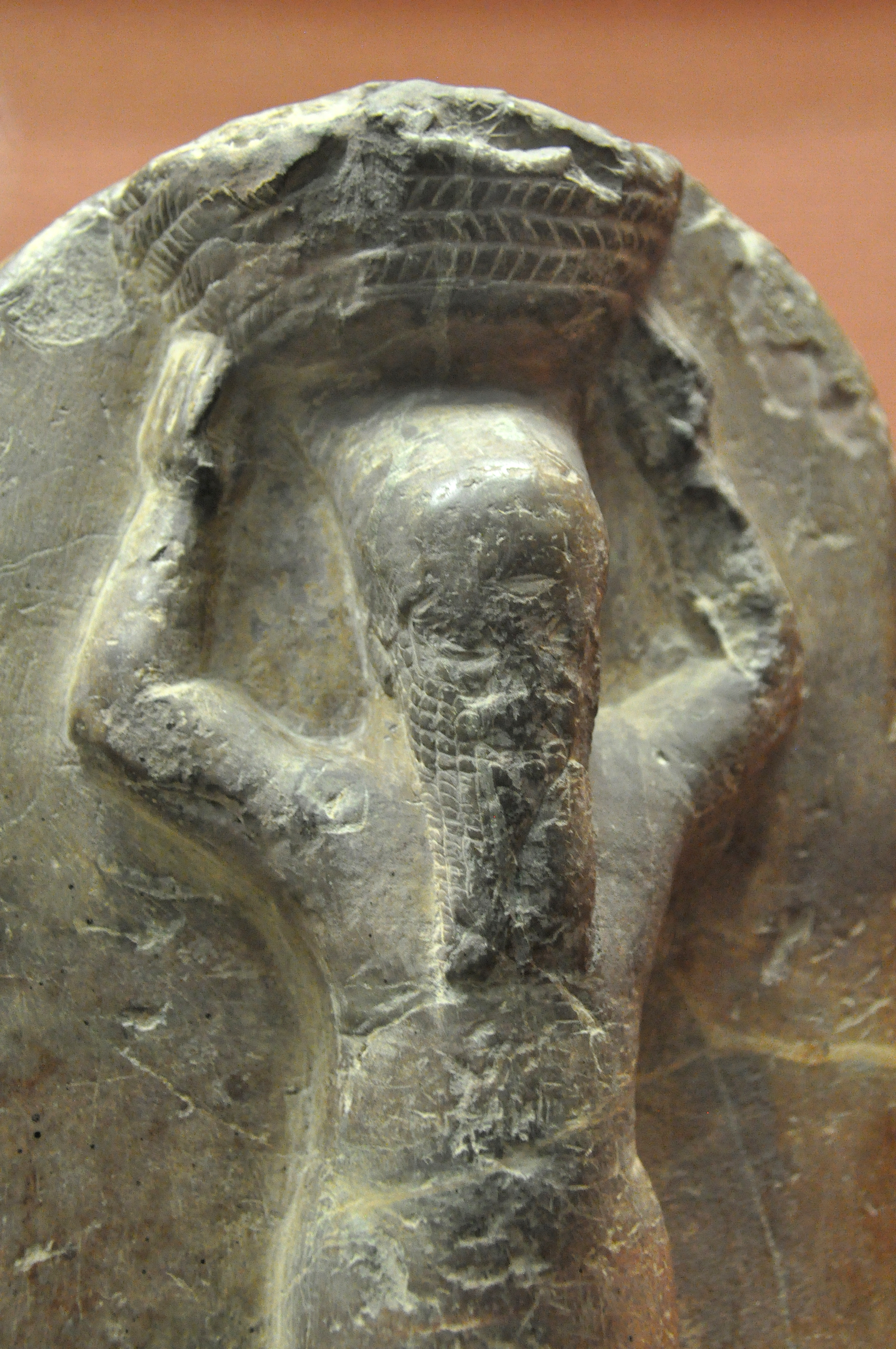
Stone monument depicting Shamash-shum-ukin as a basket-bearer.

Although Esarhaddon's inscriptions suggest that Shamash-shum-ukin should have been granted the entirety of Babylonia to rule, contemporary records only definitely prove that Shamash-shum-ukin held Babylon itself and its vicinity. The governors of some Babylonian cities, such as Nippur, Uruk and Ur, and the rulers in the Sea Land, all ignored the existence of a king in Babylon and saw Ashurbanipal as their monarch. Despite this, Shamash-shum-ukin had initially been positively inclined towards his brother, viewing him as his equal. In letters, Shamash-shum-ukin addressed Ashurbanipal simply as "my brother" (unlike how he addressed his father Esarhaddon, "the king, my father"). Although there are several letters preserved from Shamash-shum-ukin to Ashurbanipal, there are no known replies. It is possible that Ashurbanipal, on account of his network of informers, did not feel a need to write to his brother. By the 650s, Shamash-shum-ukin's opinion of Ashurbanipal had significantly deteriorated, owing to the increasing intervention and involvement of Ashurbanipal in Babylonian affairs, Ashurbanipal often delaying when help was needed, and growing dissatisfaction with his position relative to that of Ashurbanipal. A letter written during this time by Zakir, a courtier at Shamash-shum-ukin's court, to Ashurbanipal described how visitors from the Sea Land had publicly criticized Ashurbanipal in front of Shamash-shum-ukin, using the phrase "this is not the word of a king!". Zakir reported that though Shamash-shum-ukin was angered, he and his governor of Babylon, Ubaru, chose to not take action against the visitors.

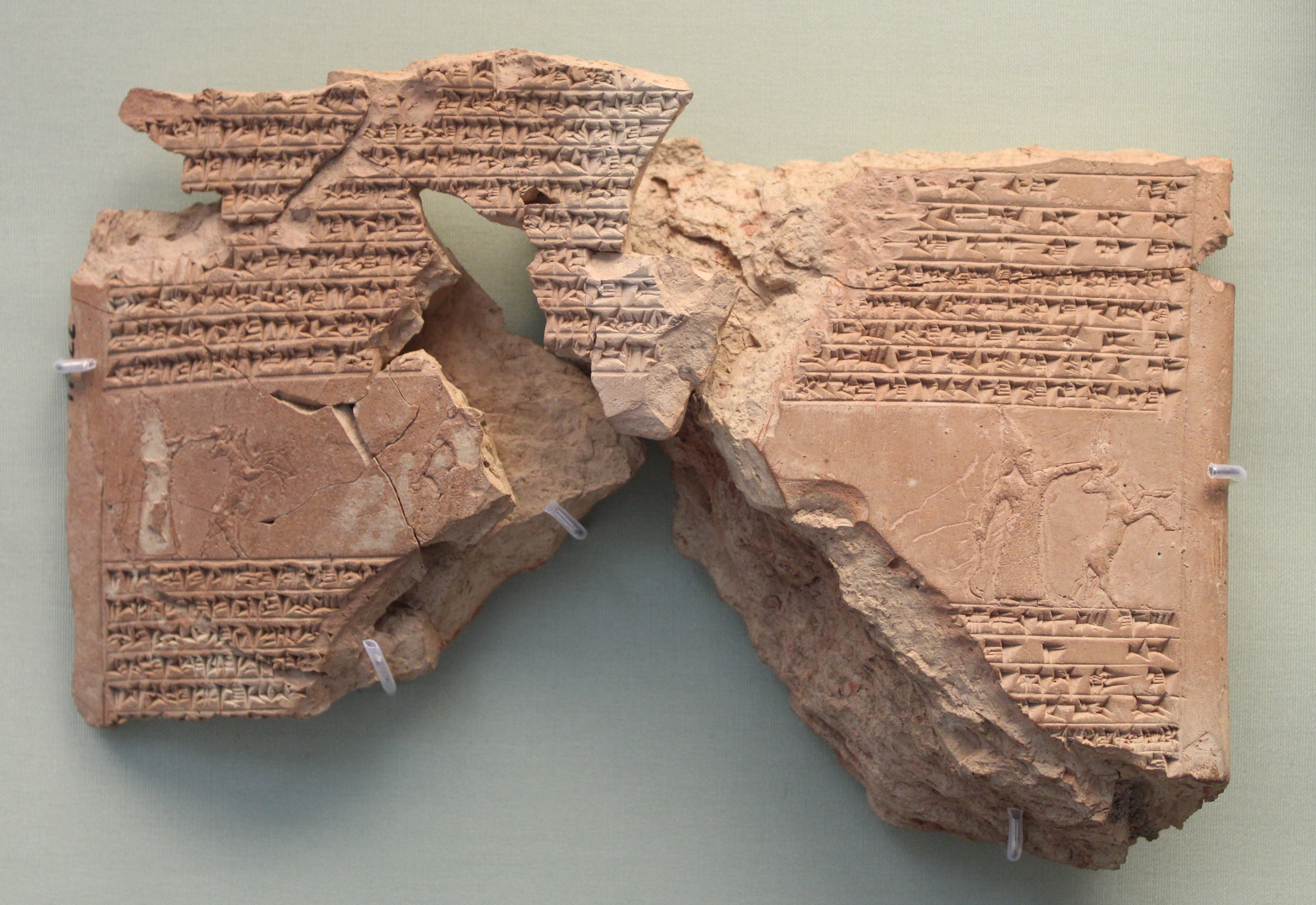
Confirmation of a land grant by Shamash-shum-ukin.

Aspiring to become independent of Ashurbanipal and free Babylonia under his own rule, Shamash-shum-ukin revolted in 652. According to later Aramaic-language legends, Ashurbanipal's and Shamash-shum-ukin's sister Serua-eterat attempted to intervene and stop the two from fighting; after the war broke out the legends hold that she disappeared into self-imposed exile. The war between the brothers lasted for three years. In addition to resenting Ashurbanipal's overbearing control, Shamash-shum-ukin's revolt was also facilitated by the certainty of support in the south: the Babylonians constantly resented Assyrian control and the rulers of Elam were certain allies, always willing to join anyone who waged war against Assyria. Inscription evidence suggests that Shamash-shum-ukin addressed the citizens of Babylon to join him in his revolt. In Ashurbanipal's inscriptions, Shamash-shum-ukin is quoted to have said "Ashurbanipal will cover with shame the name of the Babylonians", which Ashurbanipal refers to as "wind" and "lies". Soon after Shamash-shum-ukin began his revolt, the rest of southern Mesopotamia rose up against Ashurbanipal alongside him. The beginning of Ashurbanipal's account of the conflict reads as follows:

In these days Shamash-shum-ukin, the faithless brother of mine, whom I had treated well and had set up as king of Babylon, – every imaginable thing that kingship calls for, I made and gave him; soldiers, horses, chariots, I equipped and put into his hands; cities, fields, plantations, together with the people who live therein, I gave him in larger numbers than my father had ordered. But he forgot this kindness I had shown him and planned evil. Outwardly, with his lips, he was speaking fair words while inwardly his heart was designing murder. The Babylonians, who had been loyal to Assyria and faithful vassals of mine, he deceived, speaking lies to them.

According to the inscriptions of Ashurbanipal, Shamash-shum-ukin was very successful in finding allies. Ashurbanipal identified three groups who aided his brother: first and foremost there were the Chaldeans, Arameans and the other peoples of Babylonia, then there were the Elamites, and lastly the kings of Gutium, Amurru and Meluhha. It has been theorized by scholars that "Gutium" refers to the Medes (as Gutium no longer existed at this point) but this is uncertain. Meluhha might have referred to Egypt, though the Egyptians are not documented for certain to have aided Shamash-shum-ukin in the war. Shamash-shum-ukin's ambassadors to the Elamites had offered gifts (called "bribes" by Ashurbanipal) and their king, Ummanigash, sent an army under the command of Undashe, the son of Teumman, to aid in the conflict. For the first two years of the conflict, battles were fought all across Babylonia, some won by the Assyrians and some won by Shamash-shum-ukin and his allies. The war quickly turned chaotic; several minor players repeatedly changed sides and both Ashurbanipal and Shamash-shum-ukin found it difficult to keep track of their allies. Among the most notorious double agents were Nabu-bel-shumati, a governor of the far south in Babylonia whose repeated betrayals enraged Ashurbanipal.

==== Fall of Shamash-shum-ukin ====
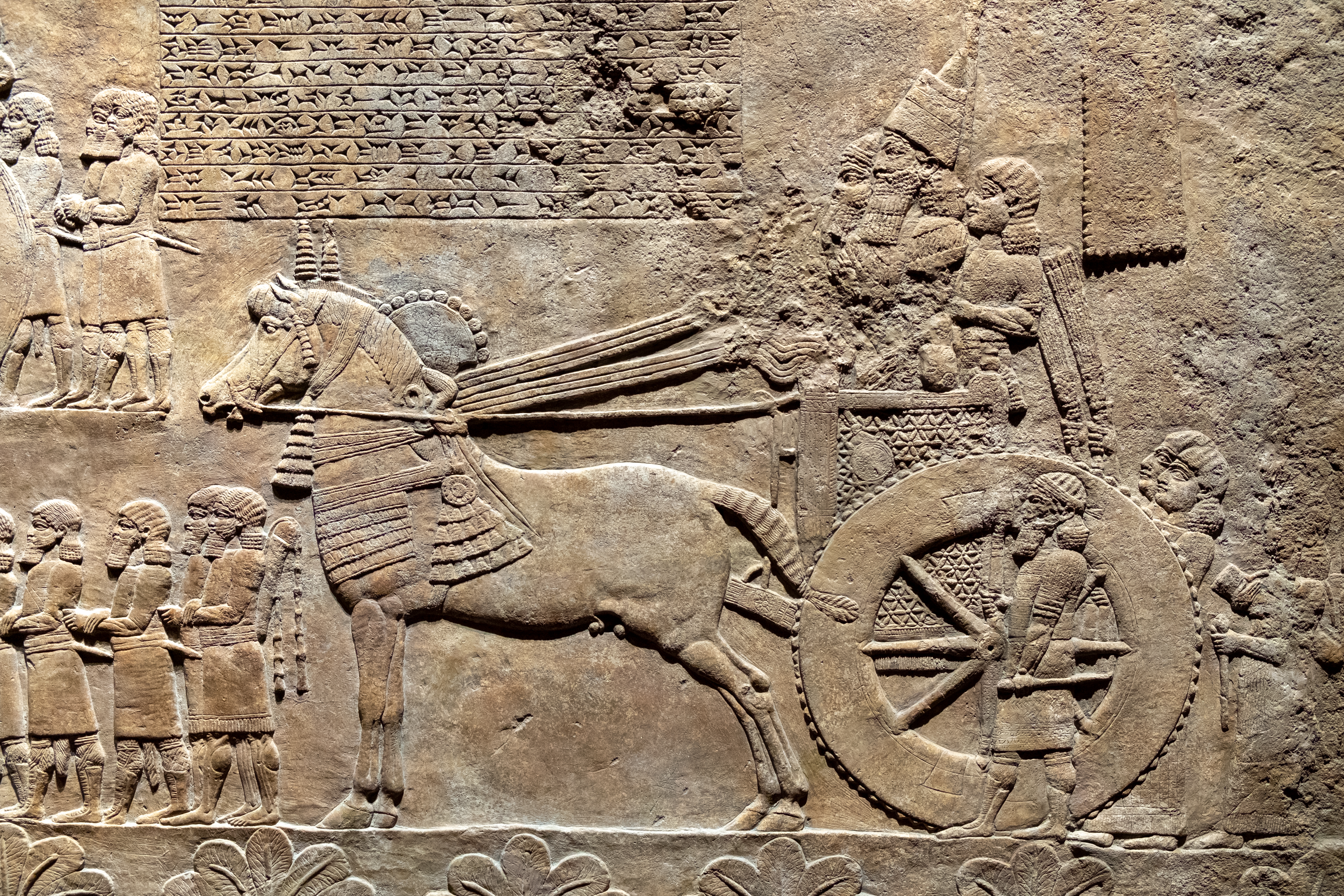
Relief depicting Ashurbanipal in a chariot, inspecting booty and prisoners from Babylon.

Despite this seemingly strong alliance of Assyrian enemies, Shamash-shum-ukin failed to halt Ashurbanipal's advance. As the war progressed, his forces were slowly defeated, his allies diminished and his lands were lost. By 650 the situation looked grim, with Ashurbanipal's forces having besieged Sippar, Borsippa, Kutha and Babylon itself. During Ashurbanipal's siege of Babylon, the city entered into a period of famine. Ashurbanipal's account of the siege claimed that some of the citizens grew so hungry and desperate that they ate their own children. Having endured both starvation and disease, Babylon fell in 648, after a siege lasting two years. The city was extensively plundered by Ashurbanipal. According to his own inscriptions, Ashurbanipal initiated a bloodbath: "their carved up bodies I fed to dogs, to pigs, to wolves, to eagles, to birds of the heavens, to fishes of the deep". At the time of the city's fall, a great fire also spread within Babylon. Shamash-shum-ukin is traditionally believed to have committed suicide by stepping into the flames, or by setting himself and his family on fire in his palace. Contemporary texts however only say that he "met a cruel death" and that the gods "consigned him to a fire and destroyed his life". In addition to suicide through self-immolation or other means, it is possible that he was executed, died accidentally or was killed in some other way. If Shamash-shum-ukin was executed, it would be logical for the Assyrian scribes to leave this out of historical records since fratricide (killing a brother) was illegal and even if a soldier (and not Ashurbanipal) had carried it out, it would still constitute a murder of a member of the Assyrian royal family.

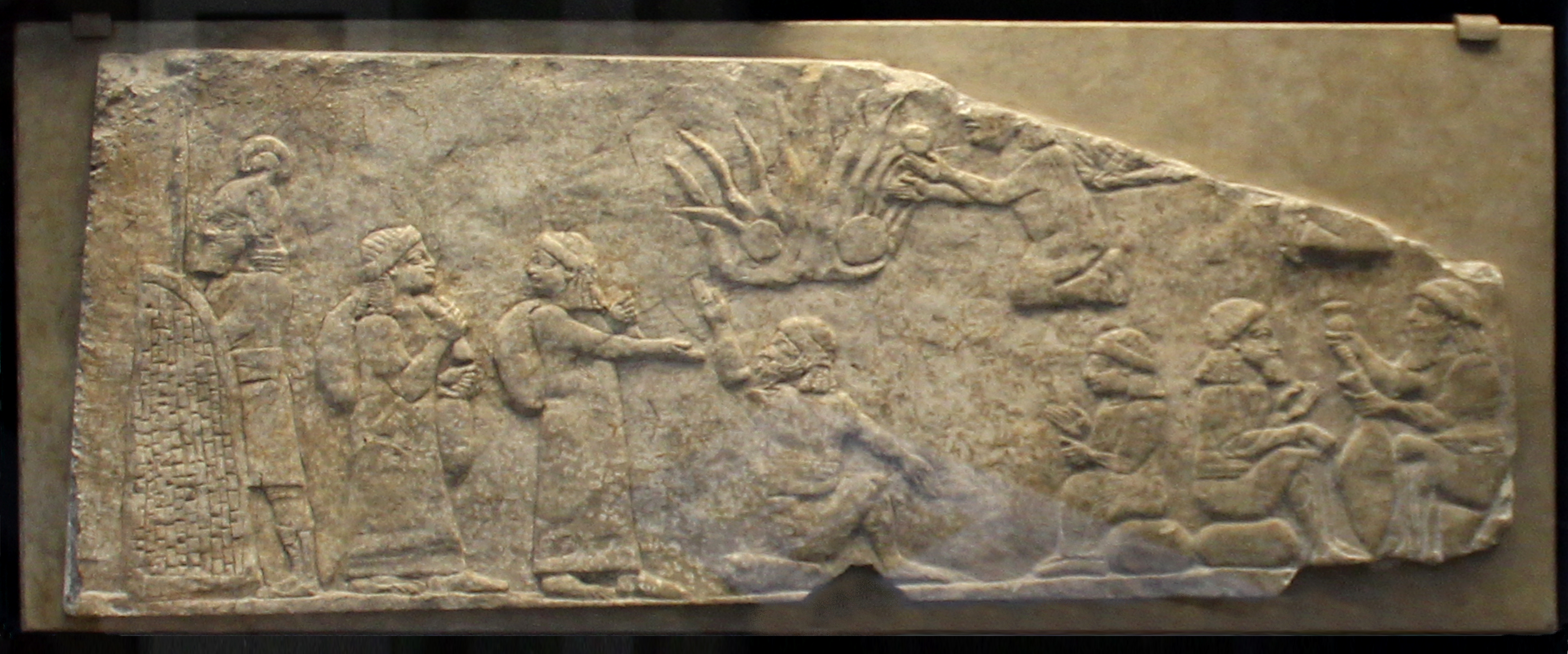
Relief depicting Babylonian prisoners under Assyrian guard.

After Shamash-shum-ukin's defeat, Ashurbanipal appointed a new vassal king of Babylon, Kandalanu, of whom little is known. Kandalanu's realm was the same as Shamash-shum-ukin's with the exception of the city of Nippur, which Ashurbanipal converted into a powerful Assyrian fortress. The authority of Kandalanu is likely to have been very limited and few records survive of his reign at Babylon. He might have been another one of Ashurbanipal's brothers or perhaps a Babylonian noble who had allied with Ashurbanipal in the civil war and had consequently been rewarded with the rank of king. Kandalanu probably lacked any true political and military power, which was instead firmly in the hands of Ashurbanipal.

Due to the defeat and death of a member of the Assyrian royal family, the defeat of Shamash-shum-ukin was Ashurbanipal's most problematic victory. The civil war also had significant broader consequences impacting Assyrian dominion. Though Babylonia slowly recovered after the war, the war exhausted economic resources and decreased the power and authority of the Assyrian Empire. Signs of decline had already been visible before the civil war but its conclusion is regarded by modern historians to mark the end of the height of Assyrian authority. Ashurbanipal's sack of Babylon, the second extensive sack of the city in thirty years, also fanned anti-Assyrian sentiment in southern Babylonia and might thus have been a decisive factor in the Babylonian revolt by Nabopolassar a few years after Ashurbanipal's death, which led to the formation of the Neo-Babylonian Empire and the fall of Assyria.

=== Destruction of Elam ===
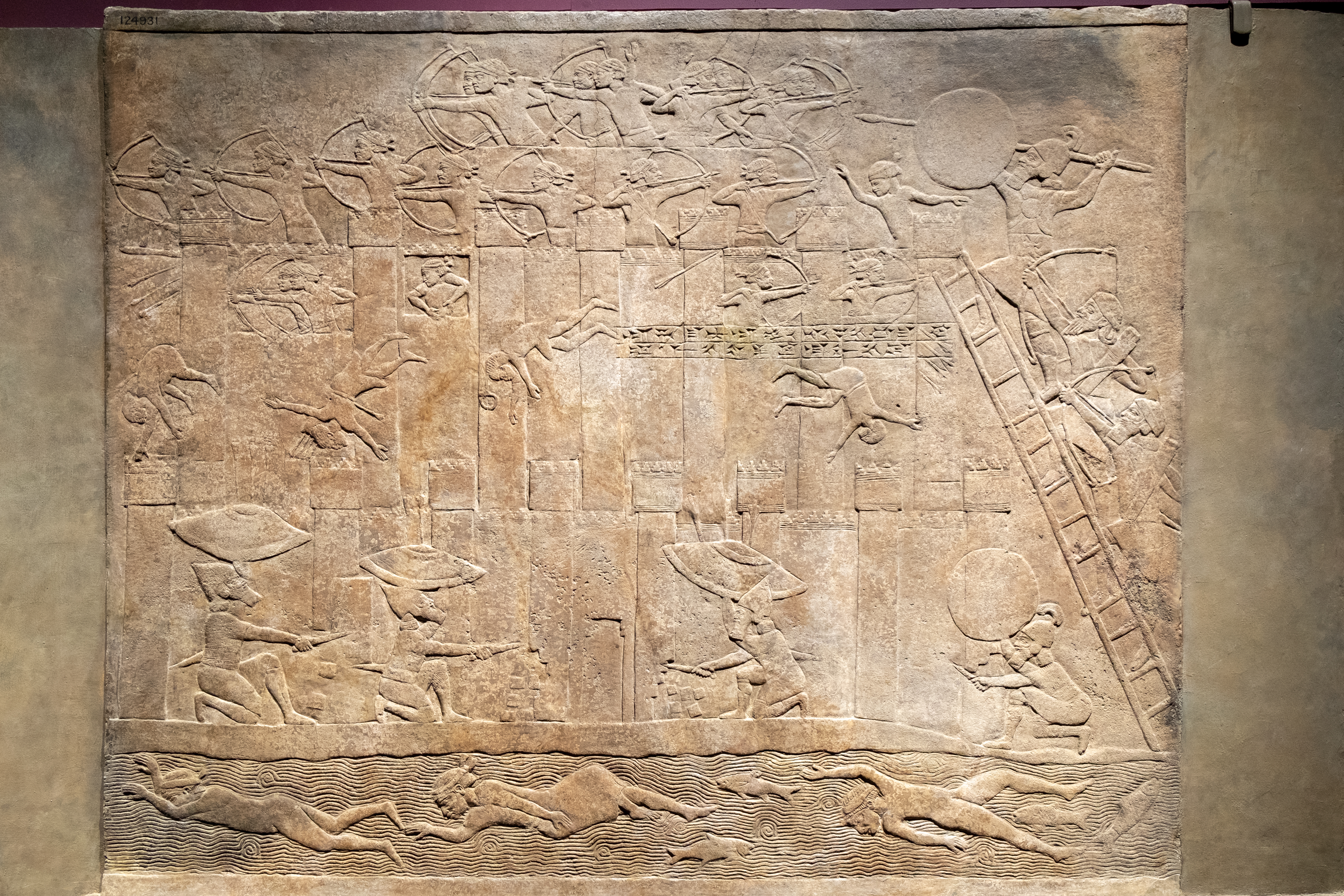
Relief depicting the Assyrians besieging the Elamite city of Hamanu in 646 BC.

The Elamite effort to support Shamash-shum-ukin in the civil war had largely come to an end with the early defeat of Ummanigash's army near the city of Der. As a result of Ummanigash's defeat, he was deposed in Elam by Tammaritu II, who then took the throne for himself. Ummanigash fled to the Assyrian court where he was granted asylum by Ashurbanipal. Tammaritu II's rule was brief and despite success in some battles against the Assyrians, alongside the rogue governor Nabu-bel-shumati (already notorious for his role in the war with Shamash-shum-ukin), he was deposed in another revolt in 649. The new king, Indabibi, had an extremely brief reign and was murdered after Ashurbanipal threatened to invade Elam again because of the kingdom's role in supporting Shamash-shum-ukin and his other enemies.

In Indabibi's stead, Humban-haltash III became king in Elam. Nabu-bel-shumati continued fighting against Ashurbanipal from outposts within Elam and though Humban-haltash was in favor of giving up the Chaldean rebel, Nabu-bel-shumati had too many supporters in Elam in order for this to go through. Because Humban-haltash could thus not respond to Ashurbanipal's threats, the Assyrians invaded Elam again in 647. After the Elamite defense collapsed, Humban-haltash abandoned his seat at Madaktu and fled into the mountains. He was briefly replaced as king by Tammaritu II, who regained his throne. After the Assyrians had plundered the region of Khuzestan they returned home, prompting Humban-haltash to reemerge from the mountains and retake the throne.

The Assyrians returned to Elam in 646 and Humban-haltash again abandoned Madaktu, fleeing first to the city Dur-Untash and then into the mountains in eastern Elam. Ashurbanipal's forces pursued him, plundering and razing cities on their way. All major political centers in Elam were crushed and nearby chiefdoms and petty kingdoms who had previously paid tribute to the Elamite king began paying tribute to Ashurbanipal instead. Among these kingdoms was Parsua, possibly a predecessor of the empire that would be founded by the Achaemenids a century later. Parsua's king, Cyrus (possibly the same person as Cyrus I, the grandfather of Cyrus the Great), had originally sided with the Elamites at the beginning of the campaign, and had thus been forced to supply his son Arukku as a hostage. Countries which had never previously had contact with the Assyrians, such as a kingdom ruled by a king called Ḫudimiri which "extended beyond Elam", also began paying tribute to the Assyrians for the first time.

On their way back from their campaign, the Assyrian forces brutally plundered Susa. In Ashurbanipal's triumphant inscriptions detailing the sack it is described in great detail, recounting how the Assyrians desecrated the royal tombs, looted and razed temples, stole the statues of the Elamite gods and sowed salt in the ground. The ancient Elamite capital was wiped off the face of the earth and Ashurbanipal then continued with the destruction of Elamite settlements on a massive scale. In addition to the destruction of numerous cities, thousands of those Elamites who were not killed were deported away from their homeland. Ashurbanipal's brutal suppression of Elam is sometimes considered a genocide. The detail and length of Ashurbanipal's inscriptions concerning the destructions suggest that the events were meant to shock the world, signalling the defeat and eradication of the Elamites as a distinct cultural entity.

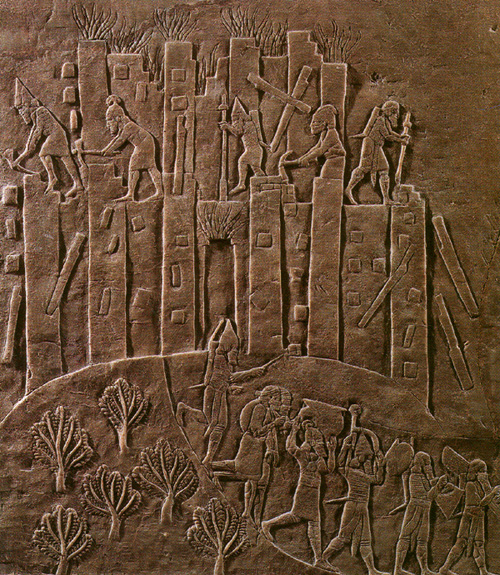
Relief depicting the Assyrians destroying Hamanu in 646 BC; flames rise from the city as Assyrian soldiers topple it with pickaxes and crowbars and carry off the spoils.

Susa, the great holy city, abode of their gods, seat of their mysteries, I conquered according to the word of Ashur and Ishtar. I entered its palaces, I dwelt there in rejoicing; I opened the treasures where silver and gold, goods and wealth were amassed [...] the treasures of Sumer, Akkad, and Babylon that the ancient kings of Elam had looted and carried away [...]. I destroyed the ziggurat of Susa [...]; I smashed its shining copper horns. [In]shushinak, god of the oracles, who resides in secret places, where no man sees his divine nature [along with the gods that surround him], with their jewelry, their wealth, their furniture, with the priests, I brought as booty to the land of Ashur [...]. I reduced the temples of Elam to naught; their gods, their goddesses, I scattered to the winds. The secret groves where no outsider had ever penetrated, where no layman had ever trod, my soldiers entered, they saw their mysteries, they destroyed them by fire. The tombs of their ancient and recent kings who had not feared [the goddess] Ishtar, my lady, and who were the cause of torments to the kings, my fathers—those tombs I devastated, I destroyed, I exposed to the sun and I carried away their bones toward the land of Ashur. [...] I devastated the provinces of Elam and [on their lands] I spread salt [...].

Despite the thorough and brutal campaign, the Elamites endured as a political entity for some time. Ashurbanipal did not annex Elam, instead leaving it to its own devices. Humban-haltash returned to rule at Madaktu and (belatedly) sent Nabu-bel-shumati to Ashurbanipal, though the Chaldean committed suicide on his way to Nineveh. After Humban-haltash was deposed, captured and sent to the Assyrians in a revolt shortly thereafter, Assyrian records cease to speak of Elam. Elam was ultimately unable to ever fully recover from Ashurbanipal's efforts in 646 and was left open to attack from tribes and kings in the surrounding lands, eventually disappearing altogether from the historical record.

=== Arabian campaigns ===
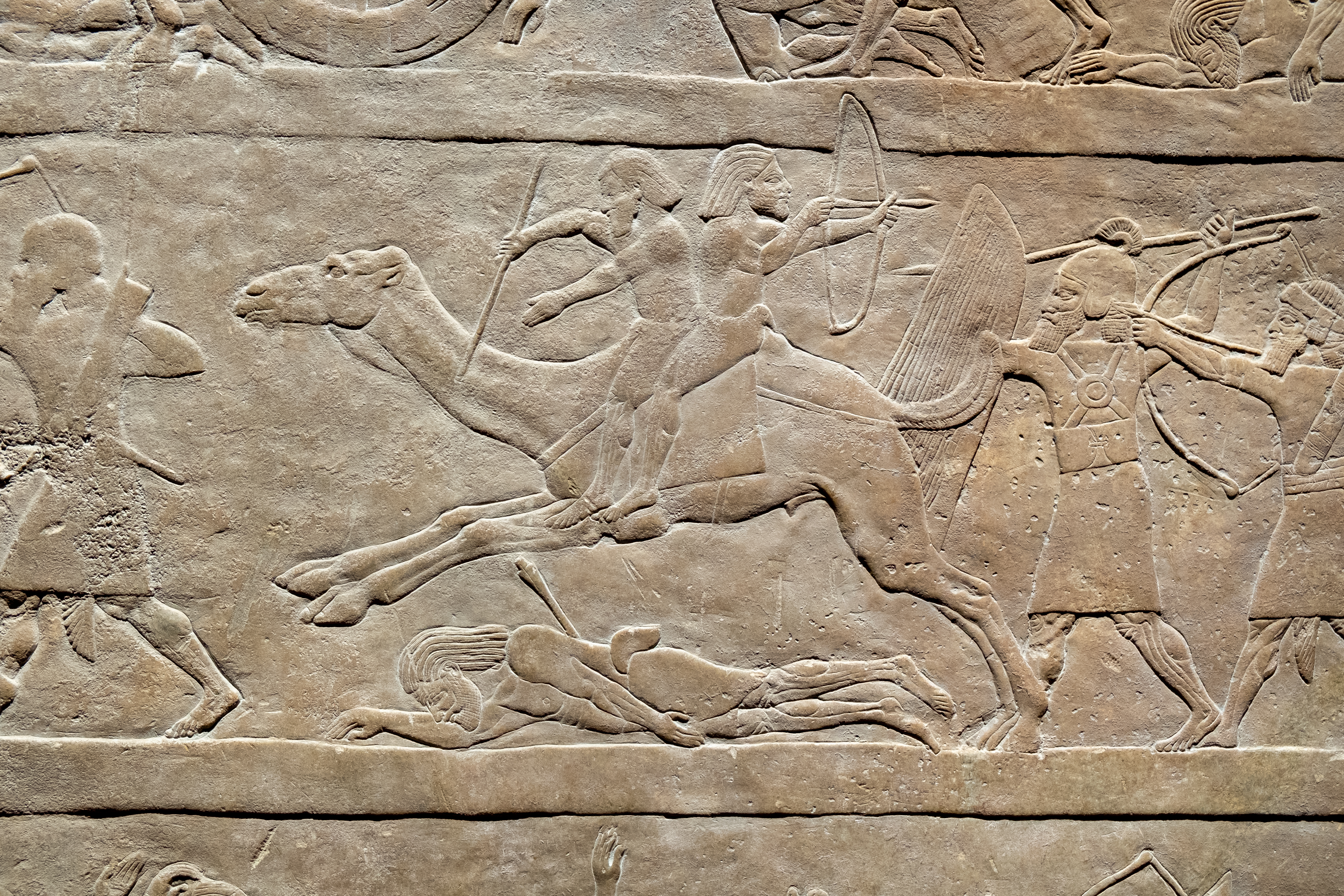
Relief from Ashurbanipal's palace showing Assyrians fighting and pursuing Arabs on camelback.

Assyrian interests in the Levant and other western territories were at times challenged on account of Arab tribal groups raiding Assyrian territories or disrupting trade. On occasion, the Assyrian army intervened, deposing and replacing problematic tribal rulers. Ashurbanipal oversaw two campaigns against Arab tribes, though their chronology is somewhat uncertain and his narrative of these conflicts was altered over the course of his later reign. The Arabian campaigns have received relatively little attention from modern historians but they are the conflicts with the most lengthy and detailed accounts in Ashurbanipal's own writings.

Ashurbanipal's first campaign against the Arabs was conducted some time before the war with Shamash-shum-ukin, primarily against the Qedarites. Ashurbanipal's earliest account of his campaign against the Qedarites was created in 649 BC and describes how Yauta, son of Ḫazaʾil, king of the Qedarites, revolted against Ashurbanipal together with another Arab king, Ammuladdin, and plundered the western lands of the Assyrian Empire. According to Ashurbanipal's account, the Assyrian army, together with the army of Kamas-halta of Moab, defeated the rebel forces. Ammuladdin was captured and sent in chains to Assyria but Yauta escaped. In the place of Yauta a loyal Arabian warlord called Abiyate was granted kingship of the Qedarites. Ashurbanipal's account of this conflict is markedly different from the accounts of his other campaigns: the phrase "in my nth campaign" (otherwise always used) is missing, the defeat of the enemy is explicitly attributed to the army rather than to Ashurbanipal personally, and Yauta escapes rather than being captured and/or executed. A second version of the narrative, composed a year later, also includes that Ashurbanipal defeated Adiya, a queen of the Arabs, and that Yauta fled to another chieftain, Natnu of the Nabayyate, who refused him and remained loyal to Ashurbanipal. Even later versions of the narrative also include mentions of how Yauta previously revolted against Esarhaddon, years prior. These later accounts also explicitly connect Yauta's rebellion to the revolt of Shamash-shum-ukin, placing it at the same time and suggesting that the western raids by the Arabs were prompted by the instability caused by the Assyrian civil war. In both accounts, the Qedarite lands were thoroughly plundered at the conclusion of the war.

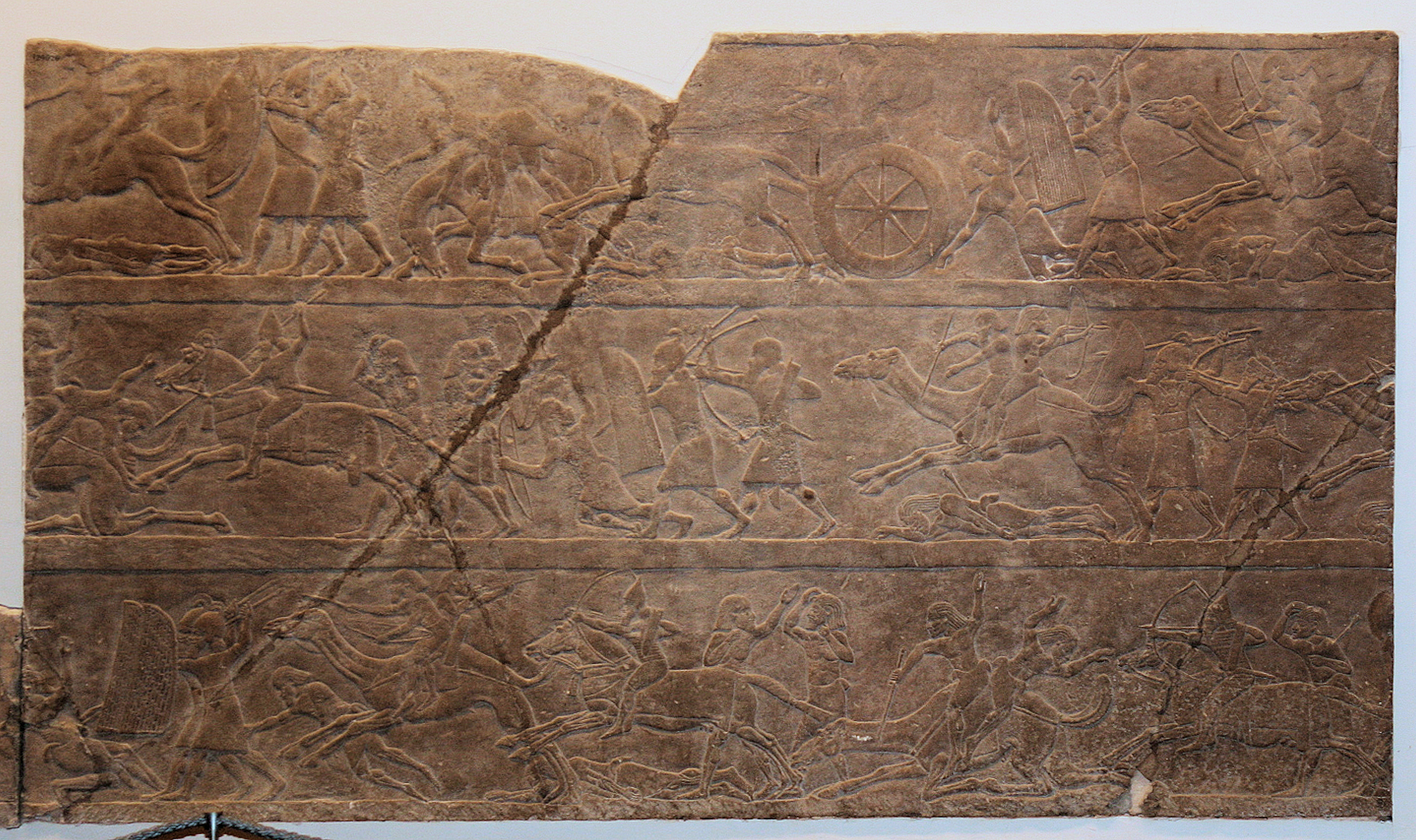
Relief from Ashurbanipal's palace showing fighting between Assyrians and Arabs.

Some of the Arab tribal leaders joined Shamash-shum-ukin in the Assyrian civil war. Among them were Abiyate, made king by Ashurbanipal's forces, and his brother Aya-ammu, who sent soldiers to Babylonia. Because of Ashurbanipal's focus on Elam, they initially escaped retaliation and punishment. As the Elamite wars dragged on, several Arab rulers ceased to pay tribute to Ashurbanipal and began raiding nearby Assyrian settlements, severely disrupting trade. This development proved enough for Ashurbanipal's generals to organize a major campaign to restore order. Ashurbanipal's account of this conflict largely concerns the movements of his army through Syria in search of Uiate (conflated with Yauta but possibly a different person) and his Arabian soldiers. According to the account, the Assyrian army marched from Syria to Damascus and then on to Hulhuliti, after which they captured Abiyate and defeated Uššo and Akko. The Assyrians were reportedly faced with great difficulties during this war on account of the unfamiliar and hostile terrain. The Nabayyate, who had aided Ashurbanipal in the previous campaign, are mentioned as being defeated in the second war against the Arabs, without any further information on what had led to the change in their relationship between the two campaigns. The last known version of the Arabian narrative specifies the two campaigns as together composing Ashurbanipal's ninth campaign and further expands them with more details. In this version, Abiyate and Ammuladdin are specified to have joined Shamash-shum-ukin. Ashurbanipal is in this version also for the first time personally credited with the victories of the campaign. This later version also states that Uiate was captured and paraded in Nineveh together with prisoners captured during the wars in Elam, that Uiate was hitched up to Ashurbanipal's chariot like a horse, and that Aya-ammu was flayed alive.

Supposedly spoils brought back from the Arabian campaigns were so extensive that they caused inflation in the Assyrian Empire and famine in Arabia. Despite this, and despite being impressive in the sense that no previous Assyrian ruler had campaigned against the Arabs with the same vigor, Ashurbanipal's Arabian campaigns are sometimes assessed as a strategic blunder. The two wars were time-consuming, wasted valuable resources and failed to consolidate Assyrian rule over any of the lands they took place in.

== Late reign and succession ==
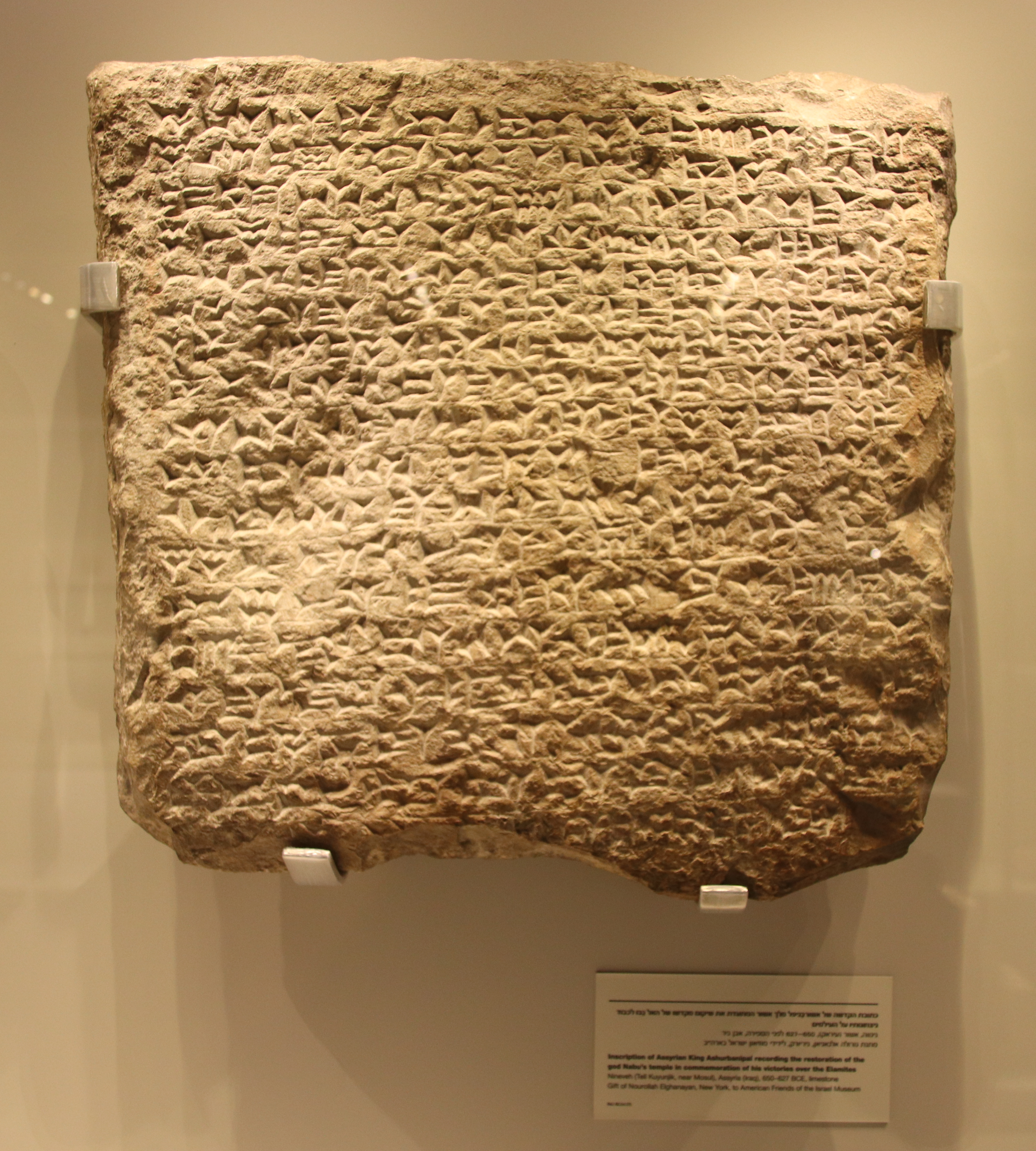
Inscription by Ashurbanipal written at some point after 646, concerning the restoration of a temple dedicated to Nabu.

The end of Ashurbanipal's reign and the beginning of the reign of his son and successor, Ashur-etil-ilani, is shrouded in mystery on account of a lack of available sources. Events in Ashurbanipal's reign after 649 are relatively poorly recorded since the secure eponym canon (known Assyrian year names) ends in that year. After 639, only two inscriptions by Ashurbanipal are known, a sharp contrast to the abundant records known from previous years. This scarcity of documentation might reflect the beginning of a serious internal political crisis. Ashurbanipal's late reign appears to have seen a growing disconnect between the king and the traditional elite of the empire. Ashurbanipal heavily promoted eunuchs to prominent positions, to the detriment of the nobility and aristocracy. At some point late in his reign, the chief singer, Bullutu, was made eponym, an unprecedented and perhaps self-indulgent move. Some Assyriologists, such as Eckart Frahm, have drawn parallels between the sparse evidence from Ashurbanipal's late reign and Sardanapalus, in Greco-Roman literary tradition the decadent last king of Assyria, based on Ashurbanipal. Ashurbanipal himself recognized that he had failed to maintain the durability of the Assyrian Empire. In one of his final known inscriptions, saddened and faced with his own mortality due to illness, lamented the state of his empire. This inscription reads:

I cannot do away with the strife in my country and the dissensions in my family; disturbing scandals oppress me always. Illness of mind and flesh bow me down; with cries of woe I bring my days to an end. On the day of the city god, the day of the festival, I am wretched; death is seizing hold upon me, and bears me down...

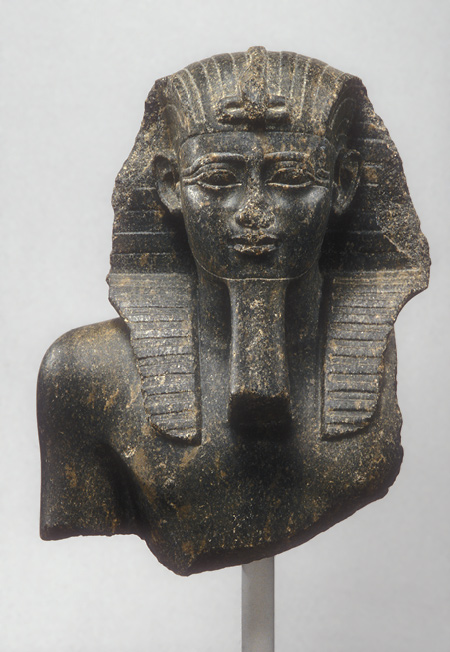
Bust of Pharaoh Psamtik I (r. 664–610), who peacefully restored Egyptian independence.

In addition to internal strife, it is clear that the hold of the Assyrian Empire on its peripheral regions had severely weakened by the end of Ashurbanipal's reign. Some peripheral lands had regained independence; there was for instance no longer an Assyrian presence in the southern Levant, where the Egyptians had instead become the hegemonic power. Ashurbanipal's late reign may have also seen the beginning of rebellious movements in Babylonia (precursors of that of Nabopolassar). Egypt already regained independence in the middle of Ashurbanipal's reign. Egypt appears to have been liberated peacefully and gradually under Necho I's son and successor Psamtik I, who had been educated at the Assyrian court. After becoming king in 664 as a loyal Assyrian vassal, Psamtik slowly extended his control across all of Egypt, unifying the country in 656 and initiating a period of renaissance and prosperity, eventually becoming fully independent of Ashurbanipal. Psamtik remained an ally of Assyria; during the later Medo-Babylonian conquest of the Assyrian Empire in the reign of Sinsharishkun (Ashur-etil-ilani's successor and another son of Ashurbanipal) both Psamtik and his son Necho II rushed to Assyria's aid, with Egyptian armies fighting alongside the Assyrians.

Inscriptions by Ashur-etil-ilani suggest that his father died a natural death, but do not shed light on when or how this happened. Though his final year is often erroneously given as 627 or even 626, this follows an estimate from an inscription written nearly a century later at Harran by Adad-guppi, the mother of the Neo-Babylonian king Nabonidus (r. 556–539). The final contemporary evidence for Ashurbanipal being alive and reigning as king is a contract from Nippur made in 631. If Ashurbanipal's reign had ended in 627 the inscriptions of his successors Ashur-etil-ilani and Sinsharishkun in Babylon (covering several years) would have been impossible, given that the city was seized by Nabopolassar in 626 and never again fell into Assyrian hands. To get the attested lengths of the reigns of his successors to match, it is generally agreed that Ashurbanipal either died, abdicated or was deposed in 631 or 630. 631 is typically favored as the year of his death. Ashurbanipal was succeeded as king by Ashur-etil-ilani and he seems to have been inspired by the succession plans of his father, despite its consequences, given that Sinsharishkun was granted the fortress-city of Nippur and was designated to be the successor of Kandalanu in Babylon once Kandalanu died.

A handful of historians have attempted to justify a reign of Ashurbanipal extending to 627, though no such proposal is without problems. It is possible that the 42-year (rather than 38-year) error came about in later Mesopotamian historiography on account of the knowledge that Ashurbanipal ruled concurrently with Babylonian rulers Shamash-shum-ukin and Kandalanu, whose reigns together amount to 42 years, but Kandalanu survived Ashurbanipal by three years, actually dying in 627. One possible way to justify a 42-year reign of Ashurbanipal is by assuming there was a coregency between him and Ashur-etil-ilani, but there had never been a coregency in prior Assyrian history and the idea is explicitly contradicted by Ashur-etil-ilani's own inscriptions, which describe him as becoming king after the end of his father's reign. Another once popular idea, for instance favored by Stefan Zawadzki, is that Ashurbanipal and Kandalanu were the same person, "Kandalanu" simply being the name the king used in Babylon. This idea is generally considered unlikely for several reasons, most notably that no previous Assyrian king is known to have used an alternate name in Babylon and that inscriptions from Babylonia show a difference in the lengths of the reigns of Ashurbanipal and Kandalanu (Ashurbanipal's reign is counted from his first full year as king, 668, and Kandalanu's is counted from his first full year as king, 647). All Assyrian kings who personally ruled Babylon used the title "king of Babylon" in their inscriptions, but that title is not used in any of Ashurbanipal's inscriptions, even those made after 648. Most importantly, Babylonian documents clearly treat Ashurbanipal and Kandalanu as two different people.

== Family and children ==
Neo-Assyrian family tree

Key (male • female • KING)

- ADAD-NIRARI II (r. 911-891 BC)
  - TUKULTI-NINURTA II (r. 890-884 BC)
    - ASHURNASIRPAL II (r. 883-859 BC), m. Mullissu-mukannishat-Ninua
      - SHALMANESER III (r. 859-824 BC)
        - Ashur-danin-pal
        - SHAMSHI-ADAD V (r. 824-811 BC), m. Shammuramat
          - ADAD-NIRARI III (r.811-783 BC)
            - SHALMANESER IV (r. 783-773 BC), m. Hama
            - ASHUR-DAN III (r. 773-755 BC)
            - ASHUR-NIRARI V (r. 755-745 BC)
              - TIGLATH-PILESER III (r. 745-727 BC), m. Yaba
                - SHALMANESER V (r. 727-722 BC), m. Banitu
                - (?) SARGON II (r. 722-705 BC), m. (1) Atalia, (2) Ra'ima
                  - SENNACHERIB (r. 705-681 BC), m. (1) Tashmetu-sharrat, (2) Naqi'a
                    - Ashur-nadin-shumi
                    - Ashur-ili-muballissu
                    - Arda-mulissu
                    - Ashur-shumu-ushabshi
                    - ESARHADDON (r. 681-669 BC), m. Esharra-hammat
                      - Seru'a-etirat
                      - Sin-nadin-apli
                      - Shamash-shum-ukin
                      - ASHURBANIPAL (r. 669-631 BC), m. Libbali-sharrat
                        - ASHUR-ETIL-ILANI (r. 631-627 BC)
                        - SIN-SHAR-ISHKUN (r. 627-612 BC)
                          - ASHUR-UBALLIT II (r. 612-609 BC)
                      - (among others)
                    - Nergal-shumu-ibni
                    - Nabu-shar-usur
                    - Shadditu
                  - Ahat-abisha
                - Sin-ahu-usur

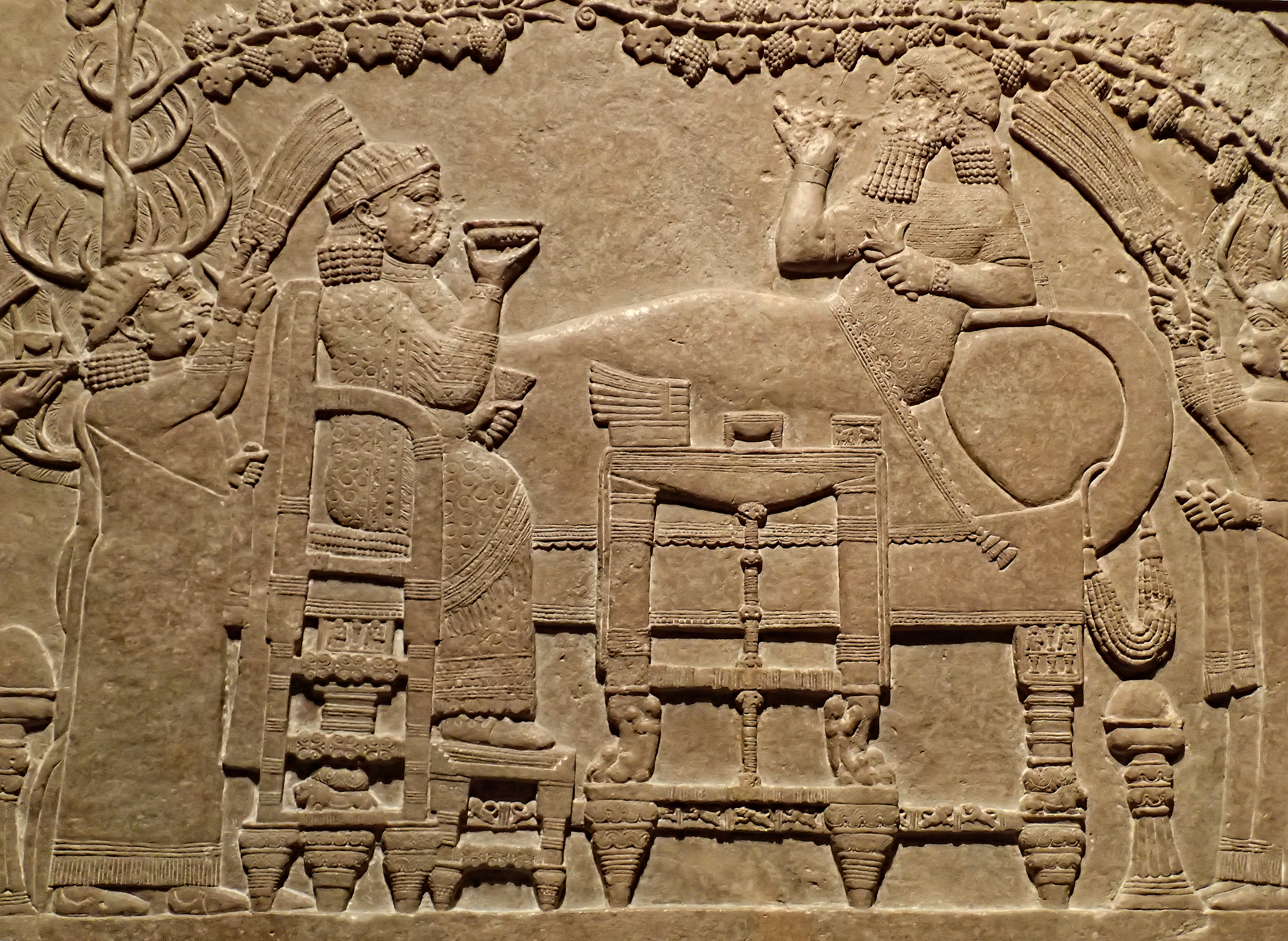
Portion of the "Garden Party" relief, depicting Ashurbanipal (right) and his queen Libbali-sharrat (left)

Ashurbanipal was already married to his queen Libbāli-šarrat (Akkadian: 𒊩𒌷𒊮𒌷𒊬𒋥) at the time of his accession to the throne, perhaps marrying her around the time of his proclamation as crown prince. The marriage occurring around that time is supported by Libbali-sharrat's name, which she is attested under before the death of Esarhaddon. The name is unique, not known to have been borne by any other individual, and incorporates the element šarratum ("queen"), indicating that it was not her birth name but rather a name perhaps assumed upon her marriage to Ashurbanipal. Libbali-sharrat is most famous for her appearance in the so-called "Garden Party" relief from Ashurbanipal's palace, which depicts her and Ashurbanipal dining together. The scene is noteworthy for being organized around Libbali-sharrat rather than Ashurbanipal and for being the only known image from ancient Assyria depicting an individual other than the king effectively holding court (and even hosting the king).

Three of Ashurbanipal's children are known by name, all sons:

- Ashur-etil-ilani (𒀸𒋩𒉪𒅅𒀭𒈨𒌍 Aššur-etil-ilāni), who ruled as king 631–627,
- Sinsharishkun (𒁹𒀭𒌍𒌋𒌋𒃻𒌦 Sîn-šar-iškun), who ruled as king 627–612,
- Ninurta-sharru-usur (Ninurta-šarru-uṣur), who played no political role.

Libbali-sharrat was presumably the mother of Ashurbanipal's immediate successors, Ashur-etil-ilani and Sinsharishkun. Ninurtas-sharru-usur's less prominent role probably derived from him being the son of a lower wife. Libbali-sharrat might have lived for some time after Ashurbanipal's death in 631 since there is a tablet dating to Ashur-etil-ilani's reign referencing the "mother of the king". The inscriptions of Sinsharishkun which mention him being selected for the kingship "from among his equals" (i.e., brothers) suggest that Ashurbanipal had more sons in addition to the three known by name. It is also known that Ashurbanipal had at least one daughter given that there are documents from his reign that reference a "daughter of the king".

Ashurbanipal's lineage may have survived the fall of Assyria in 612–609. The mother of the last Neo-Babylonian king Nabonidus, Adad-guppi, was from Harran and had Assyrian ancestry. According to her own inscriptions, Adad-guppi was born in the 20th year of Ashurbanipal's reign (648, as years were counted from the king's first full year). British scholar Stephanie Dalley considers it "almost certain" that Adad-guppi was a daughter of Ashurbanipal on account of her own inscriptions claiming that Nabonidus was of Ashurbanipal's dynastic line. American Professor of Biblical Studies Michael B. Dick has refuted this, pointing out that even though Nabonidus did go to some length to revive some old Assyrian symbols (such as wearing a wrapped cloak in his depictions, absent in those of other Neo-Babylonian kings but present in Assyrian art) and attempted to link himself to the Sargonid dynasty, there is "no evidence whatsoever that Nabonidus was related to the Sargonid Dynasty".

== Character ==
=== Brutality ===
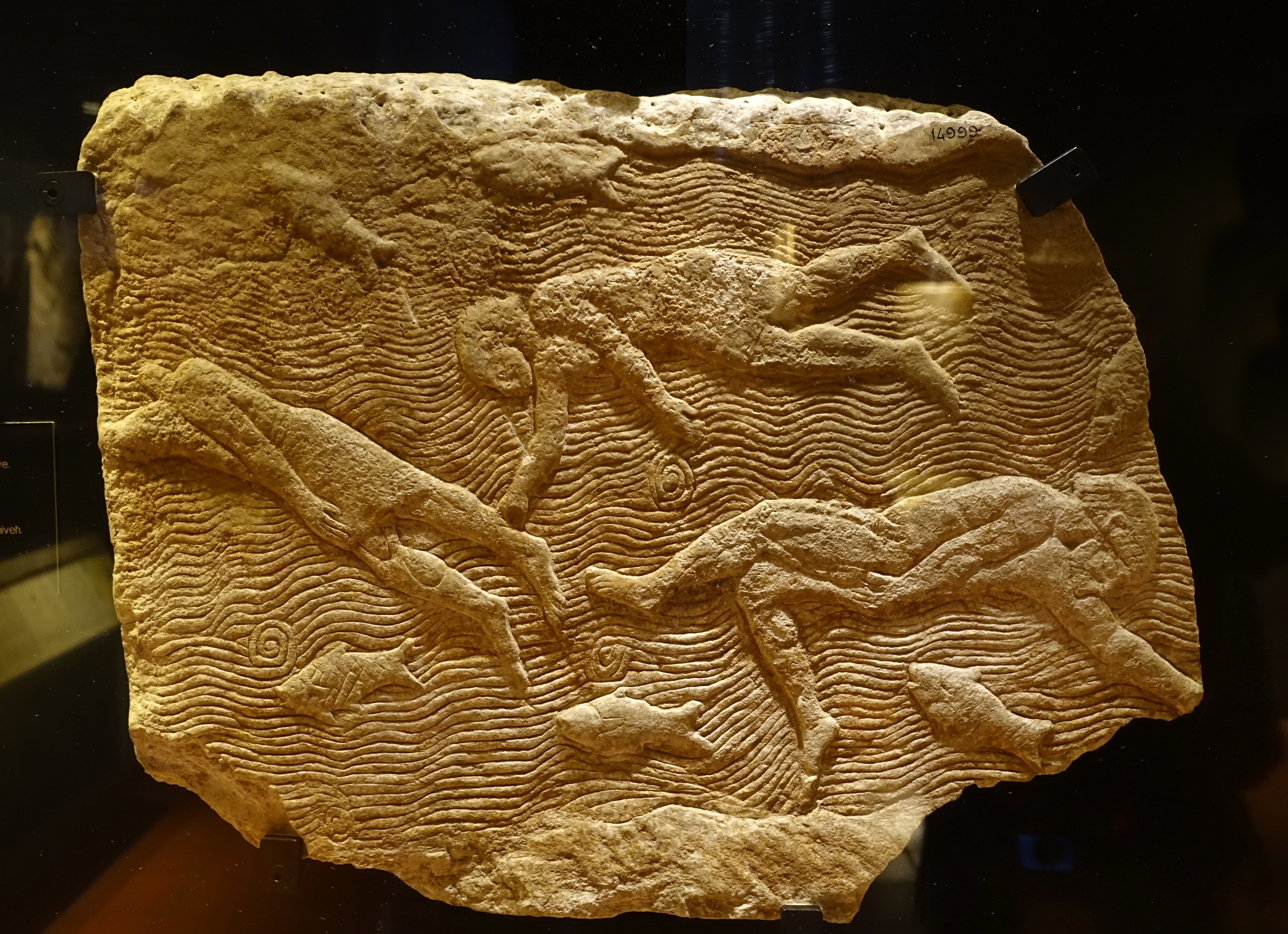
Relief from Ashurbanipal's palace depicting corpses floating down a river.

In Assyrian royal ideology, the Assyrian king was the divinely appointed mortal representative of Ashur. The king was seen as having the moral, humane and necessary obligation to extend Assyria since lands outside Assyria were regarded to be uncivilized and a threat to the cosmic and divine order within the Assyrian Empire. Expansionism was cast as a moral duty to convert chaos to civilization, rather than exploitative imperialism. Because of the Assyrian king's role as Ashur's representative, resistance or rebellion against Assyrian rule was seen as fighting against divine will, which deserved punishment. Assyrian royal ideology perceived rebels as criminals against the divine world order. Though the royal ideology could thus be used to justify enacting brutal punishments against Assyria's enemies, levels of brutality and aggression varied considerably between kings and modern scholars do not view ancient Assyria as a whole as an unusually brutal civilization. Sargon II, the founder of Ashurbanipal's dynasty, is for instance known for several times forgiving and sparing defeated enemies. Most kings only enacted brutal acts against enemy soldiers or elites, not against civilians.

Under Ashurbanipal, the Assyrian army campaigned further away from the Assyrian heartland than ever before. Though Ashurbanipal, contrary to the image presented in some of his reliefs and sharply contrasting with his predecessors, probably only rarely (if at all) participated in the military campaigns during his reign, he clearly stands out among the Assyrian kings for his exceptional brutality. It is possible that Ashurbanipal's excessive brutality can be partially explained through religious zealotry; he is known to have rebuilt, repaired and expanded a majority of the major shrines throughout his empire and many of the actions he took during his reign were due to omen reports, something he was very interested in. He also appointed two of his younger brothers, Ashur-mukin-paleya and Ashur-etel-shame-erseti-muballissu, as priests in the cities Assur and Harran respectively.

When taking all Neo-Assyrian reliefs depicting scenes of brutality together, the highest concentration of them are from Ashurbanipal's reign. Reliefs with brutality scenes from Ashurbanipal's time account for 35% of all known such depictions from the Neo-Assyrian period. Ashurbanipal is also the most brutal king in terms of the variety of different scenes depicted. He is one of only four Neo-Assyrian kings (alongside Esarhaddon, Tiglath-Pileser III and Ashurnasirpal II) who in their inscriptions claimed to have killed civilians and the one with the most varied acts against them (including live flaying, dismemberment and impalement). There are also several instances where he is recorded to have brought captive enemies to Nineveh to enthusiastically torture and humiliate them. Women were rarely depicted being harmed in Assyrian artwork, but Ashurbanipal's reliefs include some prominent exceptions to this rule. One of the reliefs from Ashurbanipal's palace in Nineveh, given the modern designation BM 124927, includes both dead female bodies and direct attacks against women. The middle part of the relief includes the most brutal act against a woman ever recorded in an Assyrian relief: Assyrian soldiers ripping open a pregnant Arab woman.

=== Cultural pursuits ===
==== Library of Ashurbanipal ====
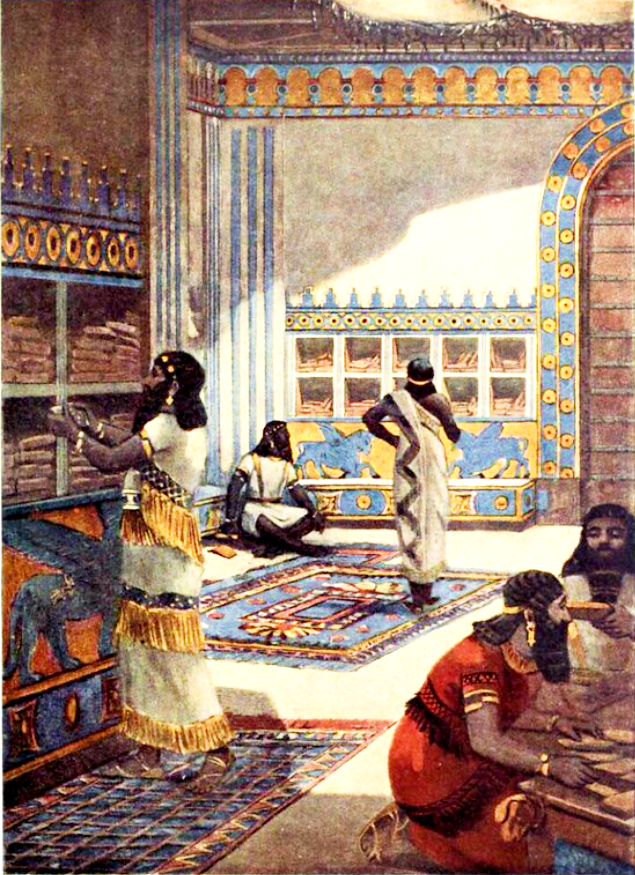
Reconstruction of the Library of Ashurbanipal.

Ashurbanipal portrayed himself as powerful in both body and mind. Typically portraying himself as carrying both weapons and a stylus, Ashurbanipal's inscriptions make him out to be unlike the kings before him, exceptionally well-versed in literature, writing, mathematics and scholarship. Deeply interested in the ancient literary culture of Mesopotamia, Ashurbanipal read complex texts in both Akkadian and Sumerian already in his youth. After he became king, using the massive resources now at his disposal, created the world's first "universal" library in Nineveh. The resulting Library of Ashurbanipal is regarded to have been by far the most extensive library in ancient Assyria and the first systematically organized library in the world. In total it encompassed perhaps more than 100,000 texts and it was not surpassed in size until the creation of the Library of Alexandria, centuries later. Around 30,000 of the documents in the library survived the destruction of Nineveh in 612 and have been excavated among the city's ruins.The library was assembled at Ashurbanipal's command, with scribes being sent out throughout the empire to collect and copy texts of every type and genre from the libraries of the temples. Most of the collected texts were observations of events and omens, texts detailing the behavior of certain men and of animals, texts on the movements of celestial objects and so forth. Present in the library were also dictionaries for Sumerian, Akkadian and other languages and many religious texts, such as rituals, fables, prayers and incantations. In addition, the tablets were organized by shape, such as four-sided tablets recorded financial transactions while round tablets recorded agricultural information. The tablets were separated by subject, identified by colored marks and written descriptions and placed in different rooms. The library contained many tablets from Babylonia, both donated and taken as war booty. Ashurbanipal's library probably represented a comprehensive and accurate picture of Mesopotamian learning up until his time. Ashurbanipal himself considered the library to be the signature accomplishment of his reign. In his inscriptions, he boasted of his own intelligence and the library's construction:

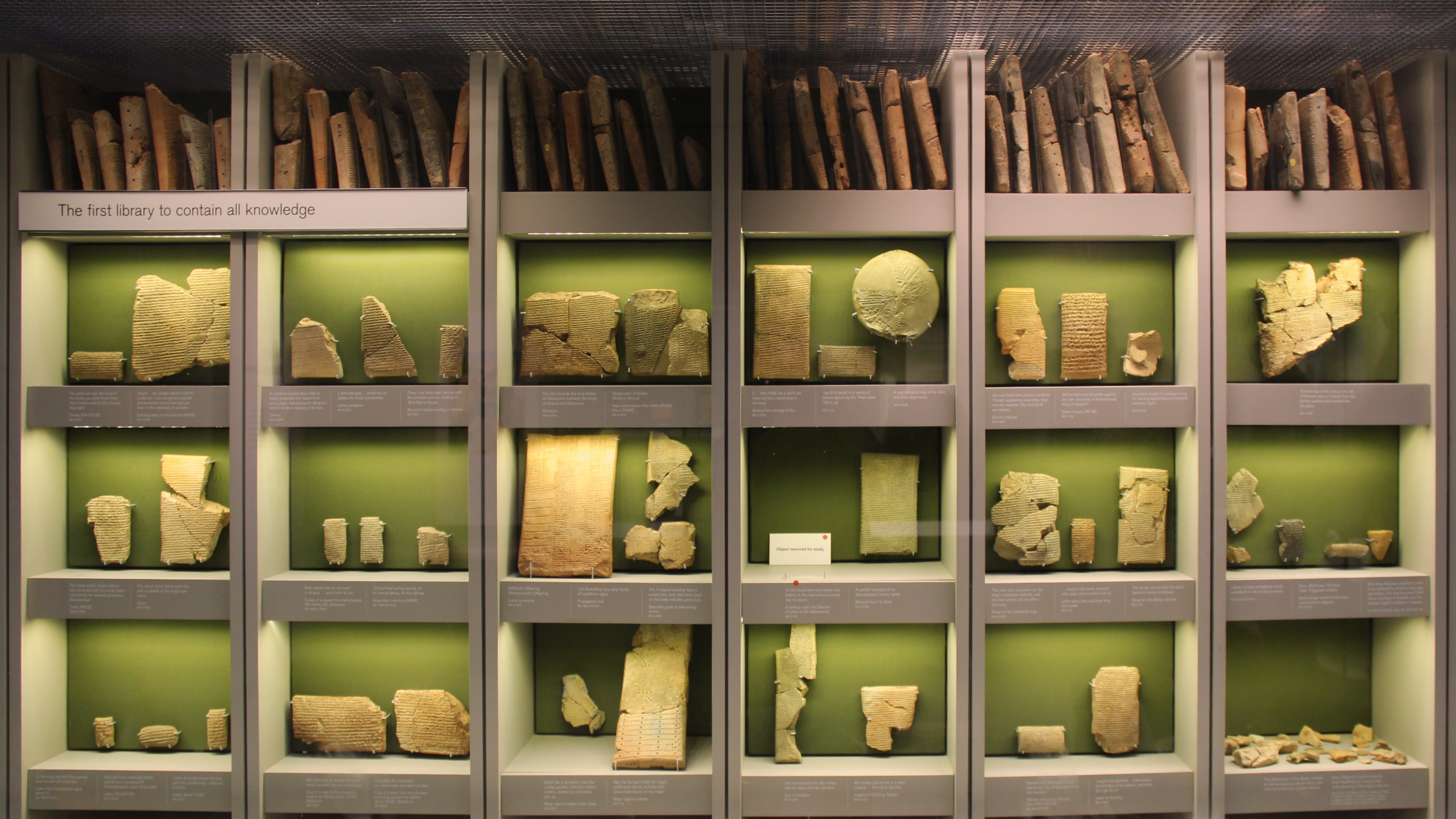
Cuneiform tablets from the Library of Ashurbanipal.

I, Ashurbanipal, king of the universe, on whom the gods have bestowed intelligence, who has acquired penetrating acumen for the most recondite details of scholarly erudition (none of my predecessors having any comprehension of such matters), I have placed these tablets for the future in the library at Nineveh for my life and for the well-being of my soul, to sustain the foundations of my royal name.

The library was long remembered in Mesopotamia. As late as in the first century AD, scribes in Babylonia still referred to the long-lost library in some of their texts and letters. Most of the traditional Mesopotamian stories and tales known today, such as the Epic of Gilgamesh, the Enûma Eliš (the Babylonian creation myth), Erra, the Myth of Etana and the Epic of Anzu, only survived until the modern era because they were included in Ashurbanipal's library. The library covered the entire spectrum of Ashurbanipal's literary interests and also included folk tales (such as The Poor Man of Nippur, a predecessor of one of the tales in One Thousand and One Nights), handbooks and scientific texts.

The library was excavated in Nineveh by Austen Henry Layard, his assistant Hormuzd Rassam, and W. K. Loftus in 1853. The library tablets have been on display in the British Museum since their discovery and continue to this day, as of 2024.

==== Artwork ====
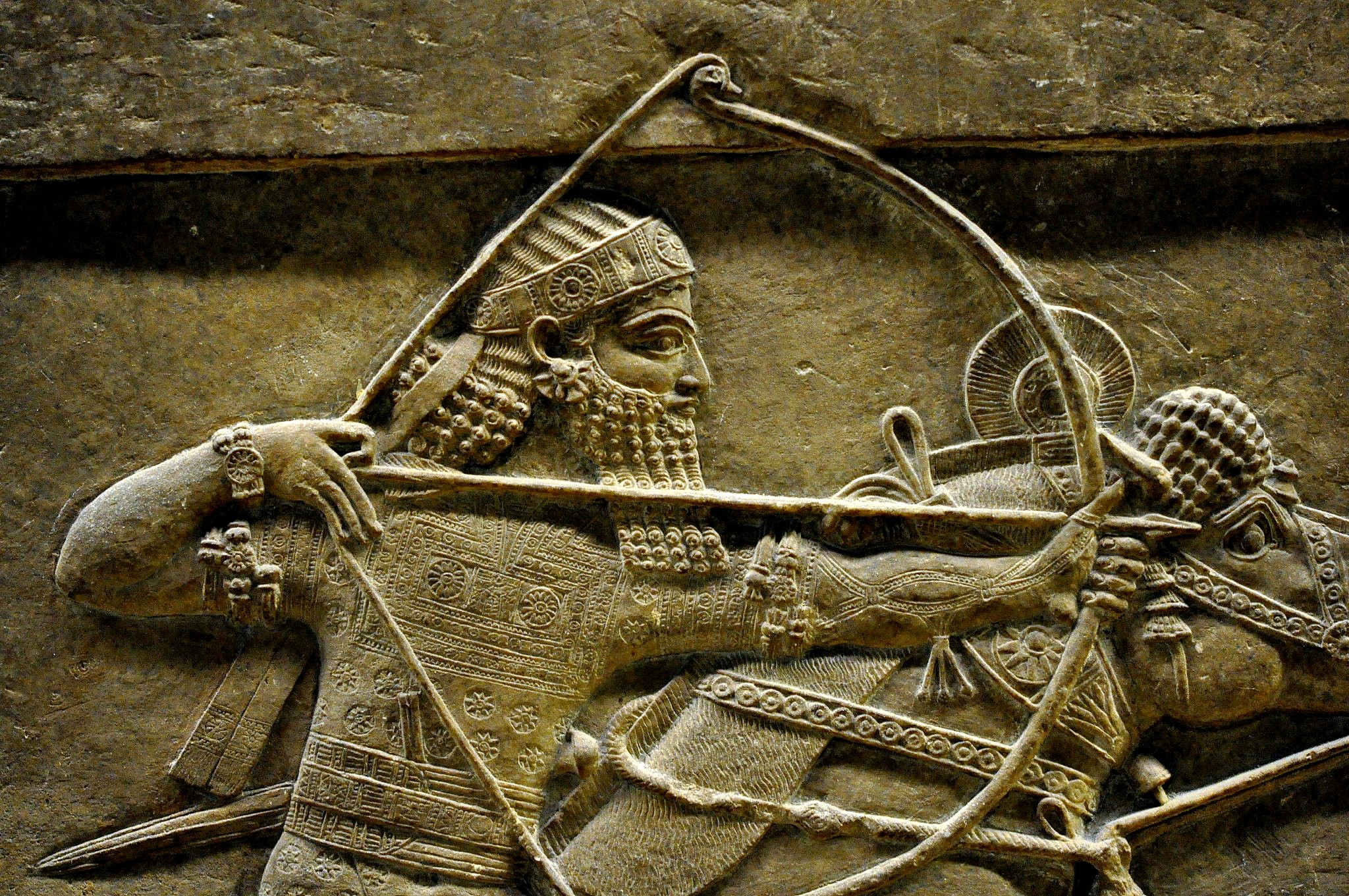
Ashurbanipal depicted in the Lion Hunt of Ashurbanipal reliefs.

Regarded as a patron of the arts, Ashurbanipal erected numerous sculptures and reliefs in his palaces in Nineveh, depicting the most important events from his long reign. Ashurbanipal's artwork was innovative in terms of Assyrian art history, often having an "epic quality" unlike much of the more static artwork produced under his predecessors. A motif appearing in several of Ashurbanipal's art pieces, for instance the Lion Hunt of Ashurbanipal, is the king killing lions, a propaganda image illustrating his glory and power, as well as his ability to safeguard the Assyrian people through slaying dangerous animals.

Various new elements can be seen in artwork produced under Ashurbanipal. The regalia of the king changes from relief to relief depending on the scene depicted; informal events for instance typically depict Ashurbanipal with an open crown design different from the typical vaguely bucket-shaped Assyrian crown. There are no known examples of art depicting Ashurbanipal seated on a throne or holding court, a common motif under previous kings, perhaps meaning that the symbol of the throne was losing its status in art, and possible also at court, during his reign. Ashurbanipal's artwork is the only ancient Assyrian art that depicts non-Assyrian foreigners as physically different (not only in their equipment and outfits but also in their features) from Assyrians. Possibly influenced by Egyptian art, which did depict foreigners differently, Ashurbanipal's reliefs show Elamites and Urartians as stockier, Urartians with larger noses, and Arabs with long straight hair (in contrast to the curly hair of the Assyrians). Inscriptions and annals from Ashurbanipal's time however offer no evidence that foreigners were seen as racially or ethnically different in terms of biology or physiognomy, which means that this might only have been an artistic choice.

== Legacy ==
=== Sardanapalus legend ===
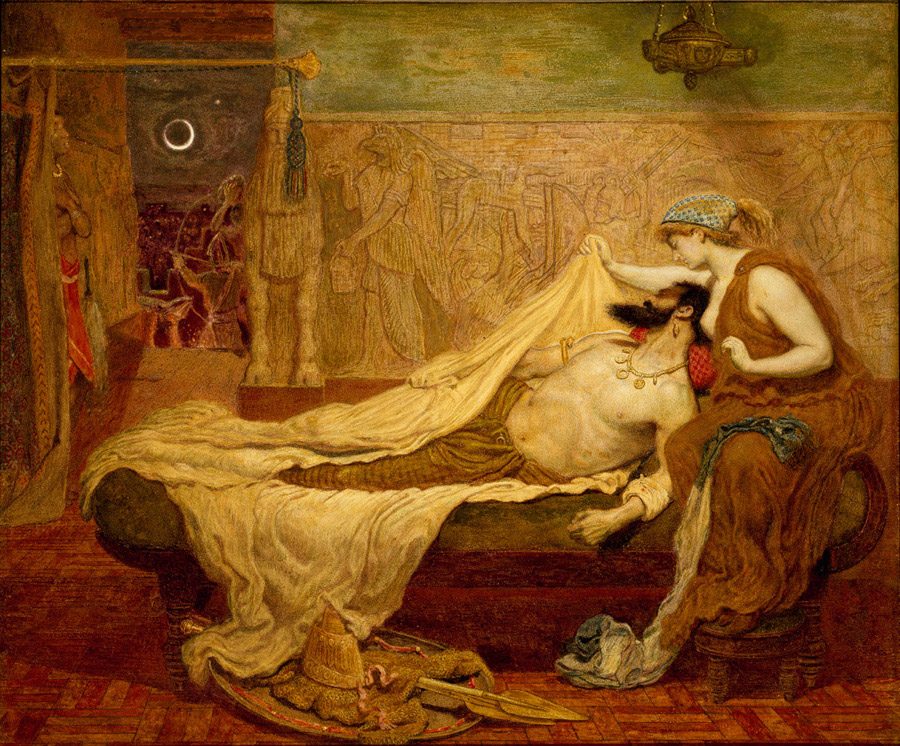
Dream of Sardanapalus (1871) by Ford Madox Brown

Tales of Ashurbanipal survived in the cultural memory of the Near East for centuries after the decline of Assyrian power in the region. He is almost certainly identifiable with the figure "Asnappar", mentioned in the Biblical Book of Ezra (4:10). It is also either Esarhaddon or Ashurbanipal who is the "king of Assyria" mentioned in the Book of 2 Chronicles (33:11). Ashurbanipal has also been most commonly identified as the Assyrian king, "Nebuchadnezzar", in the Book of Judith. Ashurbanipal and other ancient Assyrian kings and figures continued to appear in the folklore and literary tradition of northern Mesopotamia. The most prominent later legend concerning Ashurbanipal was the long-lived Greco-Roman Sardanapalus legend. According to the Assyriologist Maria de Fátima Rosa, the Sardanapalus of legend was conceived as "more effeminate than a woman, a lascivious and idle man, a governor who loathed all expressions of militarism and war". This view stemmed from ancient Greek views on Mesopotamia in general; ancient Mesopotamian kings were typically seen by the Greeks as effeminate and dull despots incapable of securing the welfare for the people of their empires. The earliest known reference to Sardanapalus comes from the 5th-century BCE Histories of Herodotus, which includes a reference to the riches of Sardanapalus, king of Nineveh. Legendary tales in Aramaic, based on the civil war between Ashurbanipal ("Sarbanabal") and Shamash-shum-ukin ("Sarmuge"), are attested from the 3rd century BC.

The most elaborate and lengthy ancient text concerning Sardanapalus comes from the 1st-century BCE Bibliotheca historica of Diodorus Siculus. Siculus's portrayal of Sardanapalus was endowed with ancient Greek orientalism; the king was stated to have lived among women, dressed like them, used a soft voice and engaged in other activities viewed as unnatural for Greek men. In Siculus's account, Sardanapalus's satrap of Media, Arbaces, saw him mingling with women in the palace and quickly revolted, assaulting Nineveh together with the Babylonian priest Belesys. After failing to urge his soldiers to defend the city, Sardanapalus locked himself in his palace chamber, with treasures and concubines, and lit up a pyre, burning down the entire capital city and ending the Assyrian Empire. It is clear from the narrative that Siculus's Sardanapalus is based not only on Ashurbanipal, but also on Shamash-shum-ukin and Sinsharishkun.

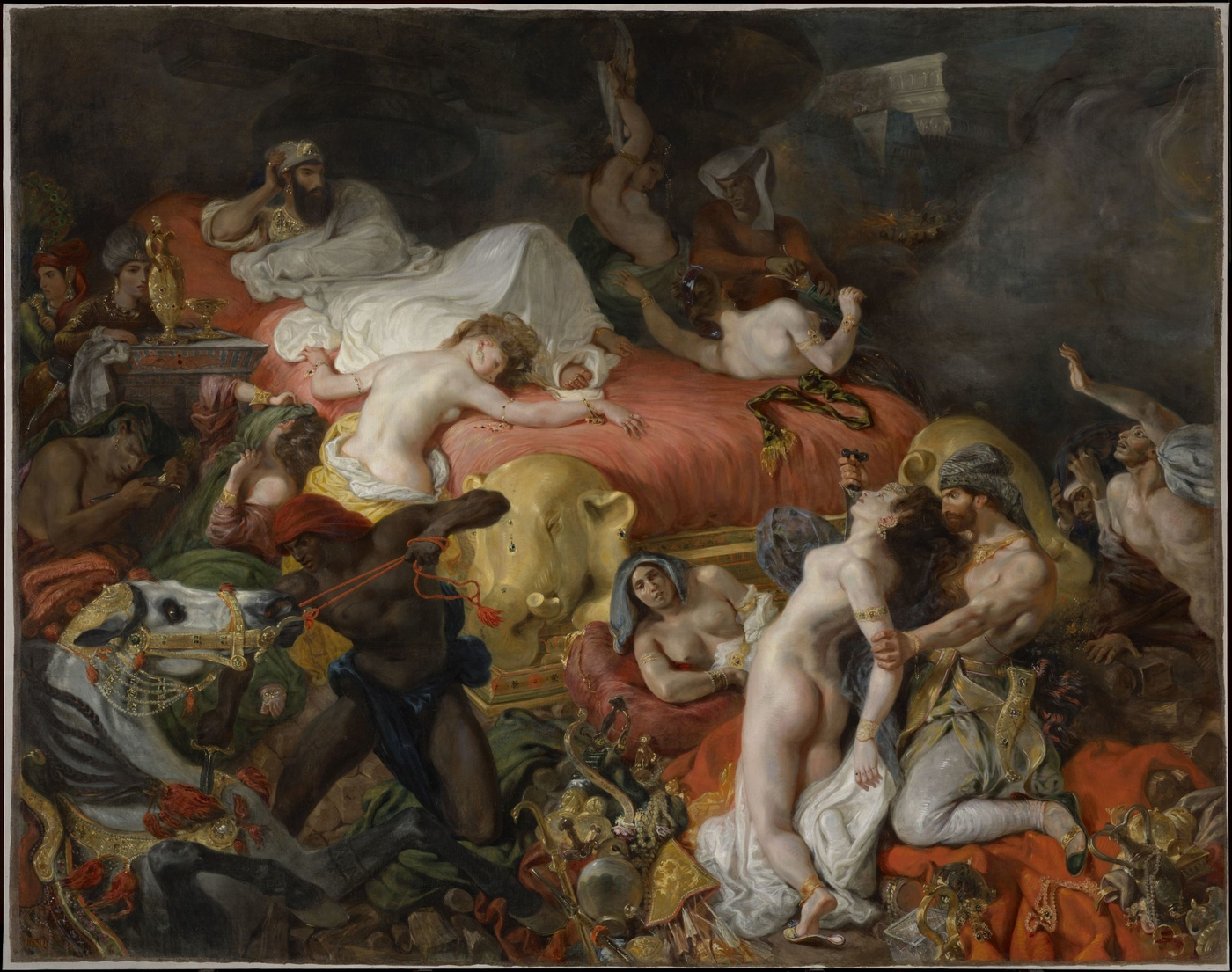
The Death of Sardanapalus (1827) by Eugène Delacroix

The Greek account of ancient Assyria transformed historical perception of the ancient empire and set the image of it in Western Europe for centuries. Since concrete evidence of Assyria and Babylonia was lacking, authors and artists during the Renaissance and Enlightenment based their interpretations of ancient Mesopotamia on classical Greco-Roman writings. In late 17th-century Italy, the composer Domenico Freschi wrote and performed the opera Sardanapalo, a comedic tragedy wherein Sardanapalus was portrayed as a woman-like and sex-eager king. In the opera, Sardanapalus, after watching Nineveh crumble, decides to light fire to his palace so that the Assyrian Empire did not fall without a show. In 1821, Lord Byron launched the historical tragedy play Sardanapalus, which pairs Sardanapalus with the legendary character Myrrah, often Sardanapalus's counterpart in later tales as well. In Byron's story, Myrrah was a female Greek slave and loyal supporter of Sardanapalus, who lit the palace on fire after Sardanapalus gave his last words, "Adieu, Assyria! I loved thee well!". Many operas, inspired by Byron, included similar storylines. It was typical to portray the fall of Nineveh and Assyria as a consequence of Assyria's supposed lack of moral values, combined with its ostentation and pomp.

Even after archaeologists and historians began to uncover the true history of ancient Assyria in the 19th century, the perception rooted in Greco-Roman tradition proved to be enduring. When the British archaeologist Austen Henry Layard found evidence of a major fire in the ruins of Nimrud (which he believed to be Nineveh) in 1845, his colleagues suggested that this was proof of the Sardanapalus legend. Even after discoveries made it clear that the Sardanapalus of legend was far from a perfect match of the Ashurbanipal of history, the legend was not forgotten. Instead, plays and films featuring Sardanapalus simply began to mix the legendary tale with historical details. Many plays began to incorporate Assyrian architectural details, such as lamassus. Two films based on the Sardanapalus legend have been produced in Italy; Giuseppe de Liguoro's Sardanapalo re dell'Assiria (1910) and Silvio Amadio's Le sette folgori di Assur (1962), both heavily influenced by Byron's play. Both follow Sardanapalus's relationship with Myrrah. In Amadio's film, the narrative is also inspired by Ashurbanipal's conflict with Shamash-shum-ukin, who appears in the film under the shortened name Shamash.

=== Modern perception ===
==== Rediscoveries and assessments ====
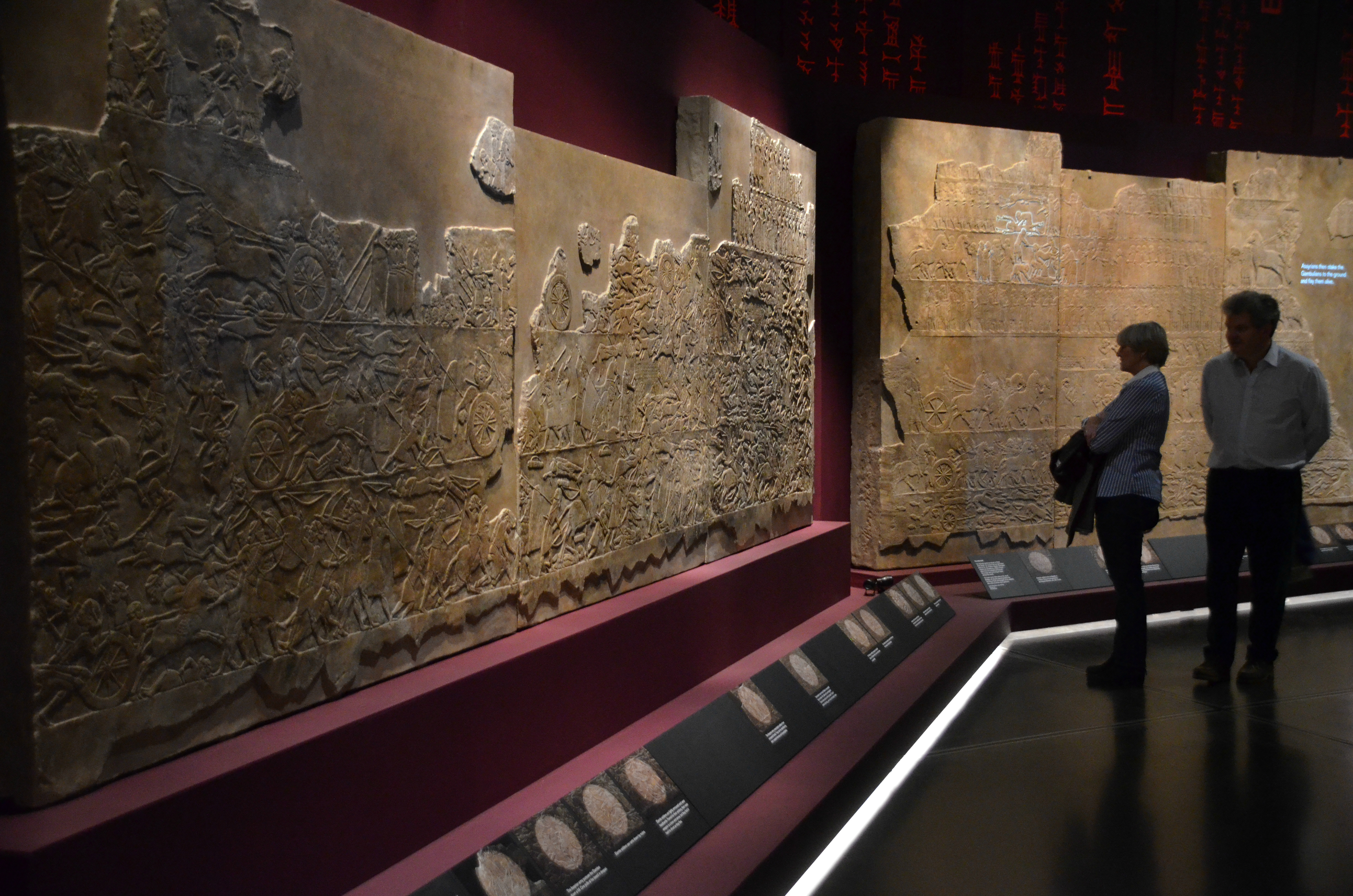
Ashurbanipal's reliefs exhibited at the British Museum as part of the exhibition I am Ashurbanipal (2018–2019)

The North Palace of Nineveh, constructed by Ashurbanipal, was rediscovered by the British-funded Assyrian archaeologist Hormuzd Rassam in December 1853. Rassam's excavations were a somewhat strange episode in Assyriology, as his efforts were also marked by an intense rivalry with the French archaeologist Victor Place; despite agreements as to who should excavate where, Ashurbanipal's palace was found by Rassam during the night, when he sent out a team of excavators under the cover of darkness to dig in the French portion of the Nineveh excavation. Excavations were conducted in the palace in 1853–1854. Among other discoveries, Rassam recovered the reliefs making up the Lion Hunt of Ashurbanipal, which were taken from the palace and transported to the British Museum, reaching England in March 1856. Because of scholarly disagreements and rivalries, as well as issues of funding, studies and publications of the finds from Ashurbanipal's palace were produced slowly, with the first detailed analyses and studies not being published until the 1930s and 1940s.

Ashurbanipal's reign was the last time when Assyrian armies campaigned all across the Middle East. He is consequently typically regarded to have been the "last great king of Assyria". Ashurbanipal's reign is sometimes considered the apogee of the Neo-Assyrian Empire, though many scholars instead consider the preceding reign of Esarhaddon as such. Whether Ashurbanipal is to blame for the fall of the Assyrian Empire relatively quickly after his death is disputed. J. A. Delaunay, author of the Encyclopædia Iranica entry on Ashurbanipal, writes that the Neo-Assyrian Empire under Ashurbanipal had already begun "exhibiting clear symptoms of impending dislocation and fall", while Donald John Wiseman, in the Encyclopaedia Britannica article on Ashurbanipal, holds that "It is no indictment of his rule that his empire fell within two decades after his death; this was due to external pressures rather than to internal strife". Gérard Chaliand holds that the fall of the Assyrian Empire should be blamed on Ashurbanipal's "mediocre heirs" rather than Ashurbanipal himself; there is however no evidence that his heirs were incompetent rulers. Sinsharishkun, under whom the empire collapsed, was a militarily competent ruler, utilizing the same tactics as his predecessors. Eckart Frahm believes the seeds of Assyria's fall were sown in Ashurbanipal's reign, in particular through the disconnect between the king and the traditional elite and through Ashurbanipal's sack of Babylon.

==== Ashurbanipal in popular culture ====
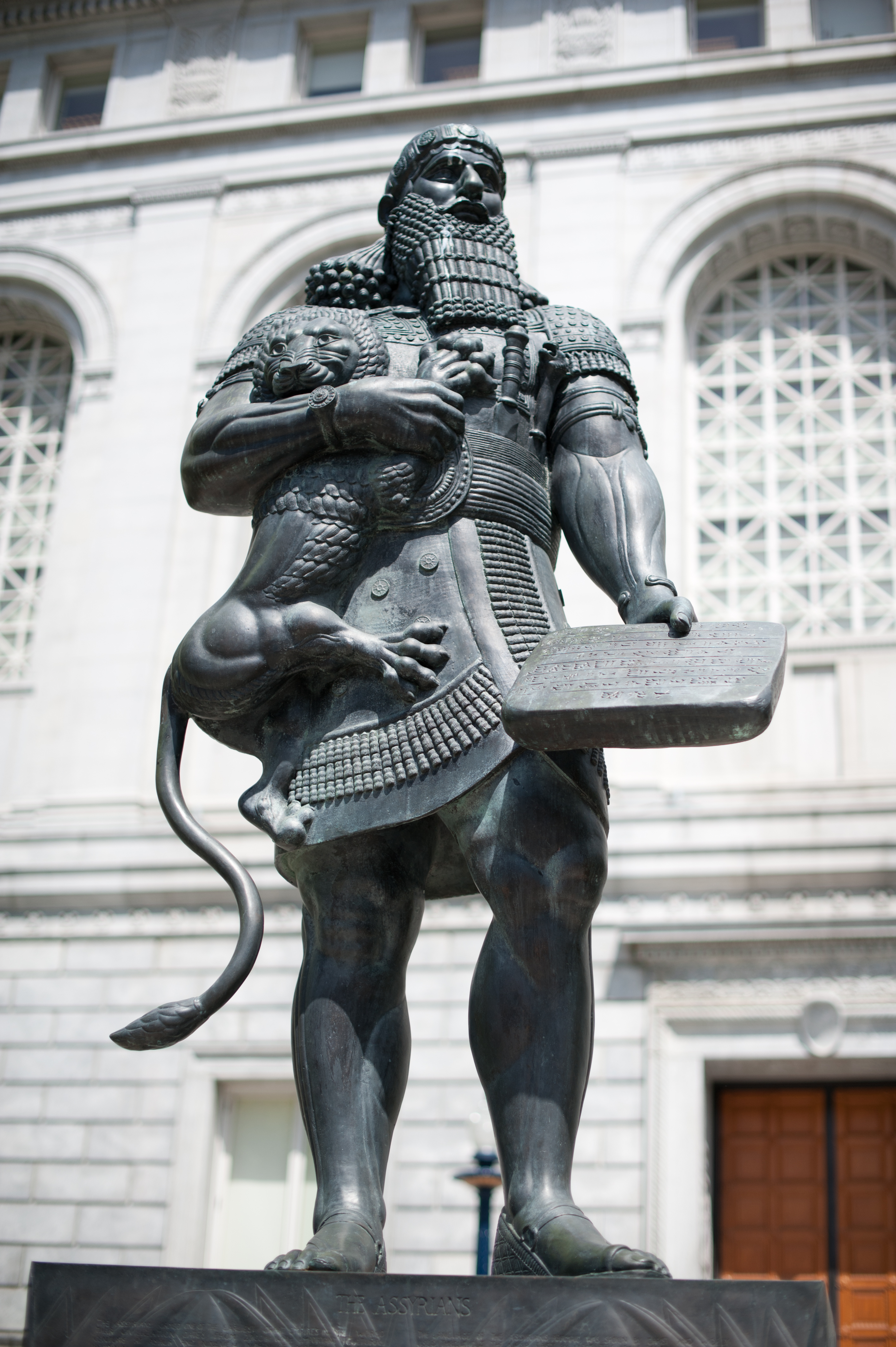
Ashurbanipal, a bronze statue by Fred Parhad in the Civic Center of San Francisco

Ashurbanipal has been the subject of numerous pieces of artwork created in modern times. In 1958, surrealist painter Leonora Carrington painted Assurbanipal Abluting Harpies, an oil on canvas at the Israel Museum depicting Ashurbanipal pouring a white substance onto the heads of pigeon-like creatures with human faces. A statue of the king, called Ashurbanipal, was created by sculptor Fred Parhad in 1988 and placed on a street near the San Francisco City Hall. The statue cost $100,000 and was described as the "first sizable bronze statue of Ashurbanipal". It was presented to the City of San Francisco as a gift from the Assyrian people on May 29, 1988, Parhad being of Assyrian descent. Some local Assyrians expressed fears that the statue resembled the legendary Mesopotamian hero Gilgamesh more than it resembled the actual Ashurbanipal. Parhad defended the statue as representing Ashurbanipal, though explained that he had taken some artistic liberties.

Ashurbanipal has also made occasional appearances in popular culture in various media. Robert E. Howard wrote a short story entitled The Fire of Asshurbanipal, first published in the December 1936 issue of Weird Tales magazine, about an "accursed jewel belonging to a king of long ago, whom the Grecians called Sardanapalus and the Semitic peoples Asshurbanipal". "The Mesopotamians", a 2007 song by They Might Be Giants, mentions Ashurbanipal alongside Sargon, Hammurabi, and Gilgamesh. Ashurbanipal was used as the ruler of the Assyrians in the game Civilization V.

Ashurbanipal once more entered the global spotlight and garnered increased fame in 2018, when reliefs from his reign were exhibited at the British Museum in the exhibition I am Ashurbanipal (8 November 2018 – 21 February 2019). The exhibition was well received, particularly due to its use of inventive technology, such as using lights to illustrate how many of Ashurbanipal's reliefs would have been painted in his lifetime, and its acknowledgement of the colonialist history of the collection itself. There was however also substantial controversy associated with the exhibition due to its sponsorship by the oil and gas company BP, involved in Middle Eastern oil since the early 20th century. The opening of the exhibition in November 2018 was met with protests, with protesters chanting slogans relating to BP's exploitation of Iraqi natural resources and pretending to sip oil-contaminated champagne.

== Titles ==
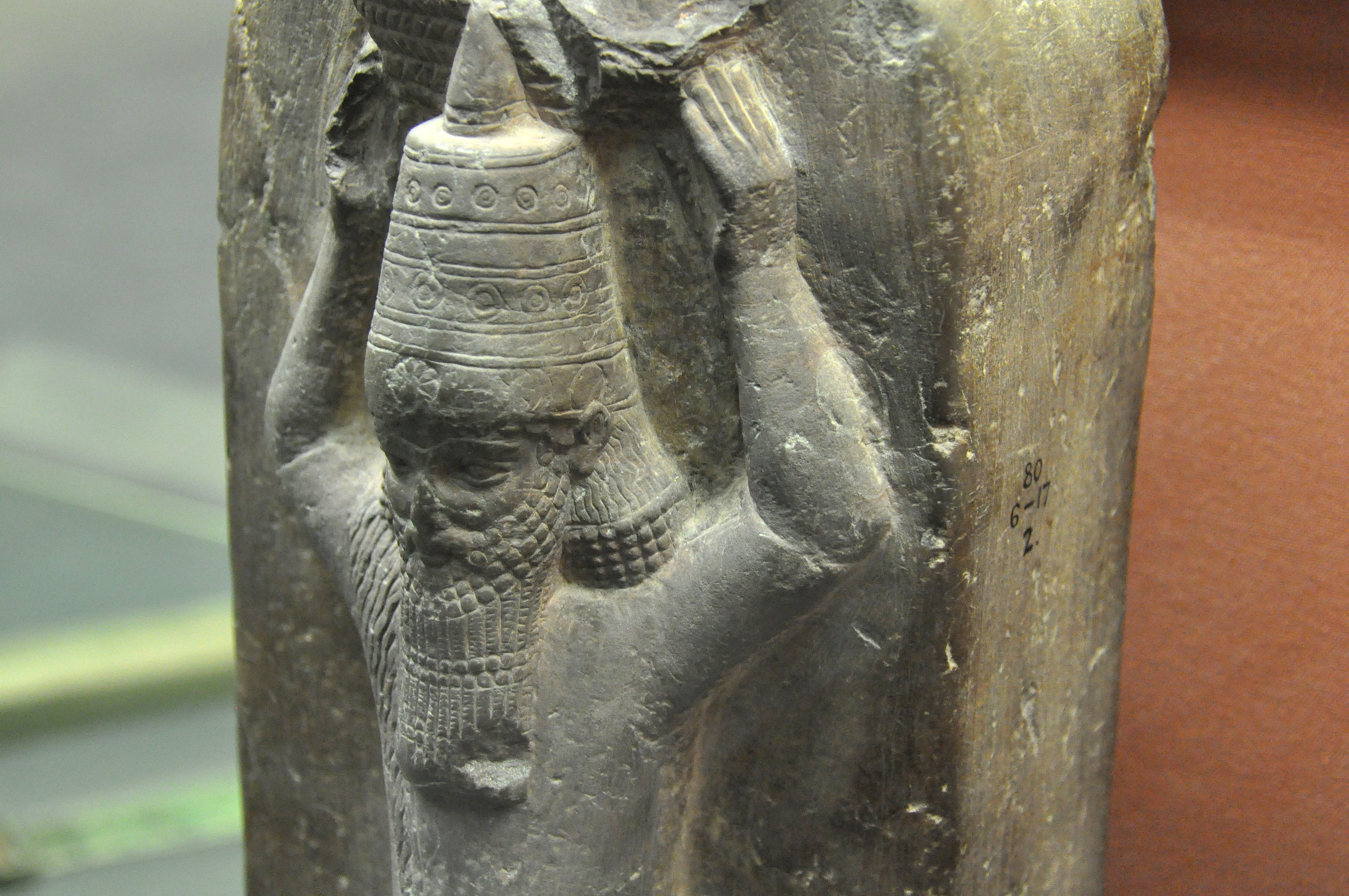
Detail of a stone monument depicting Ashurbanipal as a basket-bearer

In an inscription on a cylinder dated to 648, Ashurbanipal used the following titles:

I am Ashurbanipal, the great king, the mighty king, king of the universe, king of Assyria, king of the four regions of the world; offspring of the loins of Esarhaddon, king of the universe, king of Assyria, viceroy of Babylon, king of Sumer and Akkad; grandson of Sennacherib, king of the universe, king of Assyria.

A similar titulature is used on one of Ashurbanipal's many tablets:

I, Ashurbanipal, the great king, the mighty king, king of the universe, king of Assyria, king of the four regions of the world, son of Esarhaddon, king of the universe, king of Assyria, grandson of Sennacherib, king of the universe, king of Assyria, eternal seed of royalty ...

A longer variant is presented on one of Ashurbanipal's building inscriptions in Babylon:

Ashurbanipal, the mighty king, king of the universe, king of Assyria, king of the four regions of the world, king of kings, unrivaled prince, who, from the Upper to the Lower Sea, holds sway and has brought in submission at his feet all rulers; son of Esarhaddon, the great king, the mighty king, king of the universe, king of Assyria, viceroy of Babylon, king of Sumer and Akkad; grandson of Sennacherib, the mighty king, king of the universe, king of Assyria, am I.

== See also ==
- List of Assyrian kings
- Military history of the Neo-Assyrian Empire

== Notes ==
Ashurbanipal Sargonid dynasty Born: c. 685 BC Died: 631 BC
Preceded by Esarhaddon	King of Assyria; 669 – 631 BC	Succeeded by Ashur-etil-ilani
