= Ana-Tašmētum-taklāk =

Ancient Assyrian queen

- Woman of the Palace (Note: Though usually used by historians today, the title of "queen" as such did not exist in the Neo-Assyrian Empire. The feminine version of the word for king (šarrum) was šarratum, but this was reserved for goddesses and foreign queens who ruled in their own right. Because the consorts of the kings did not rule themselves, they were not regarded as their equals and as such not called šarratum. Instead, the term reserved for the primary consort was MUNUS É.GAL (woman of the palace). In Assyrian, this term was rendered issi ekalli, later abbreviated to sēgallu.)
- Spouse: Aššur-etil-ilāni or Sîn-šar-iškun (?)
- Akkadian: Ana-Tašmētum-taklāk

Ana-Tašmētum-taklāk (Akkadian: Ana-Tašmētum-taklāk or Ana-Tašmētu-taklak) was a queen of the Neo-Assyrian Empire. She is known only from a single fragmentary inscription and it has as of yet not been possible to confidently identify which king was her husband. She is the only Neo-Assyrian queen known by name whose husband and dates are unknown. Though various identifications have been proposed, the hypothesis with the least problems is that she was the wife of one of the last Assyrian kings, Aššur-etil-ilāni (r. 631 – 627 BC) or Sîn-šar-iškun (r. 627 – 612 BC).

== Inscription ==
Ana-Tašmētum-taklāk is known only from an inscription on a burnt limestone vessel from either Nineveh or the nearby Tarbiṣu. An origin in Nineveh is more probable. The vessel, given the designation 55-12-5, 252, in the British Museum, is a shallow dish made for some specific, though unknown, purpose. The inscription runs around the top, on the flat edge of the rim. It is unclear if the inscription is complete (and thus only a mark of ownership of the vessel) or if it is only fragmentary and was previously longer since only about half of the circumference of the vessel is preserved. The inscription was first examined and identified as recording a previously unknown Assyrian queen by Irving Finkel in 2000 during a project of editing and compiling cuneiform inscriptions for a study on Assyrian stone vessels by Julian E. Reade and Ann Searight.

The inscription on the stone vessel reads:

[šá (?) ^{f}a-na ^{d}taš]-me-tu_{4}-[tak]-lak mí.é.gal.

Translated into English:

[Belonging to(?) Ana-Taš]mētum-taklāk, the Queen.

== Identification ==
It has as of yet not been possible to identify which king was Ana-Tašmētum-taklāk's husband and she is the only Neo-Assyrian queen known by name whose husband and dates are unknown. Since her inscriptions are from either Nineveh or Tarbiṣu, she must have been active in or after the reign of Sennacherib (r. 705 – 681 BC); it was only in his reign that Nineveh was made the capital of the empire and Tarbiṣu was made the residence of the crown prince. She has variously been suggested by different authors to have been the wife of every king during the period when Nineveh was the capital. Finkel's original hypotheses included her being the queen of Sargon II (r. 722 – 705 BC), Esarhaddon (r. 681 – 669 BC), Ashurbanipal (r. 669 – 631 BC), Aššur-etil-ilāni (r. 631 – 627 BC) or Sîn-šar-iškun (r. 627 – 612 BC).

A frequently suggested possibility is that Ana-Tašmētum-taklāk was the queen of Aššur-etil-ilāni or Sîn-šar-iškun and as such one of the last Assyrian queens. It is known that both Aššur-etil-ilāni and Sîn-šar-iškun were married, as queens are attested for both of them in administrative documents, though no known inscriptions preserve their names.

=== Problematic hypotheses ===
- Queen of Sargon II: identifying Ana-Tašmētum-taklāk as a queen of Sargon II means that she would have been his second wife (married to him before or after Atalia) and the mother of Sennacherib, and that she thus lived in Nineveh after her husband's death. This hypothesis is problematic for three reasons. Firstly, it is likely that the position of queen was not retained upon the death of the king. Secondly, Sennacherib in an inscription discovered in 2014 explicitly identified his mother by the name Ra'īmâ. Thirdly, if she had been Sennacherib's mother she would appropriately have been titled as ummi šari ("Mother of the King"), a title first attested in Sennacherib's reign, not by the normal title of the queen ("Woman of the Palace").
- Queen of Sennacherib: it is possible that Ana-Tašmētum-taklāk was the first wife of Sennacherib, perhaps married to him before his more well-attested wife Tašmētu-šarrat, and the mother of his oldest children. It is notoriously difficult to reconstruct the chronology and number of relationships of Sennacherib; he is known to have had at least two consorts; Tašmētu-šarrat (who is attested as queen for certain around 694 BC) and Naqiʾa, who was the mother of Sennacherib's successor Esarhaddon (born c. 713 BC) and was prominent in his reign (indicating she was alive throughout Sennacherib's reign) but might not have actually held the title of queen. Some have suggested that there was a third consort of Sennacherib, since a stele from Assur names another woman of Sennacherib whose name, although mutilated away, might not be reconstructable as either Tašmētu-šarrat or Naqiʾa. It has been suggested that this stele was mutilated in the reign of Esarhaddon and that this woman was the mother of Sennacherib's son and murderer Arda-Mulissu. However, the fragments that are left do not preserve any title and the traces do not appear to allow for reconstructing the word for "queen" (mí.é.gal).
- Queen of Esarhaddon: identifying Ana-Tašmētum-taklāk as a queen of Esarhaddon means that she would have been his second wife, married to him after the death of his first wife Ešarra-ḫammat. Though the provenance of the stone vessel could support association with Esarhaddon, documentary evidence suggests that Esarhaddon did not remarry after Esharra-hamat's death in 672 BC and that Assyria was without a queen for the last four years of his reign; lists of officials at the royal court from after 672 BC include several officials employed by the "Mother of the Queen" (Naqiʾa) and the crown prince (Ashurbanipal), but none employed by the queen. It is most likely that the duties and responsibilities of the queen were handled by Esarhaddon's mother during this time.
- Queen of Ashurbanipal: identifying Ana-Tašmētum-taklāk as a queen of Ashurbanipal means that she would have been his first or second wife (married to him before or after Libbāli-šarrat). Identifying her as a queen of Ashurbanipal is problematic given that Libbāli-šarrat is otherwise assumed to have been his only queen and the mother of his most prominent children. Libbāli-šarrat was married to Ashurbanipal before he became king, perhaps in 672 BC, and appears in artwork from 653 BC. Aššur-etil-ilāni, Ashurbanipal's son and successor, was an adult at the time of his accession in 631 BC and may have been named heir as early as 660 BC. If Aššur-etil-ilāni was Libbāli-šarrat's son, Libbāli-šarrat was alive at the time of Ashurbanipal's death and later as well since documents from his reign mention the "Mother of the King".
