= Queens of the Neo-Assyrian Empire =

Ancient Mesopotamian women

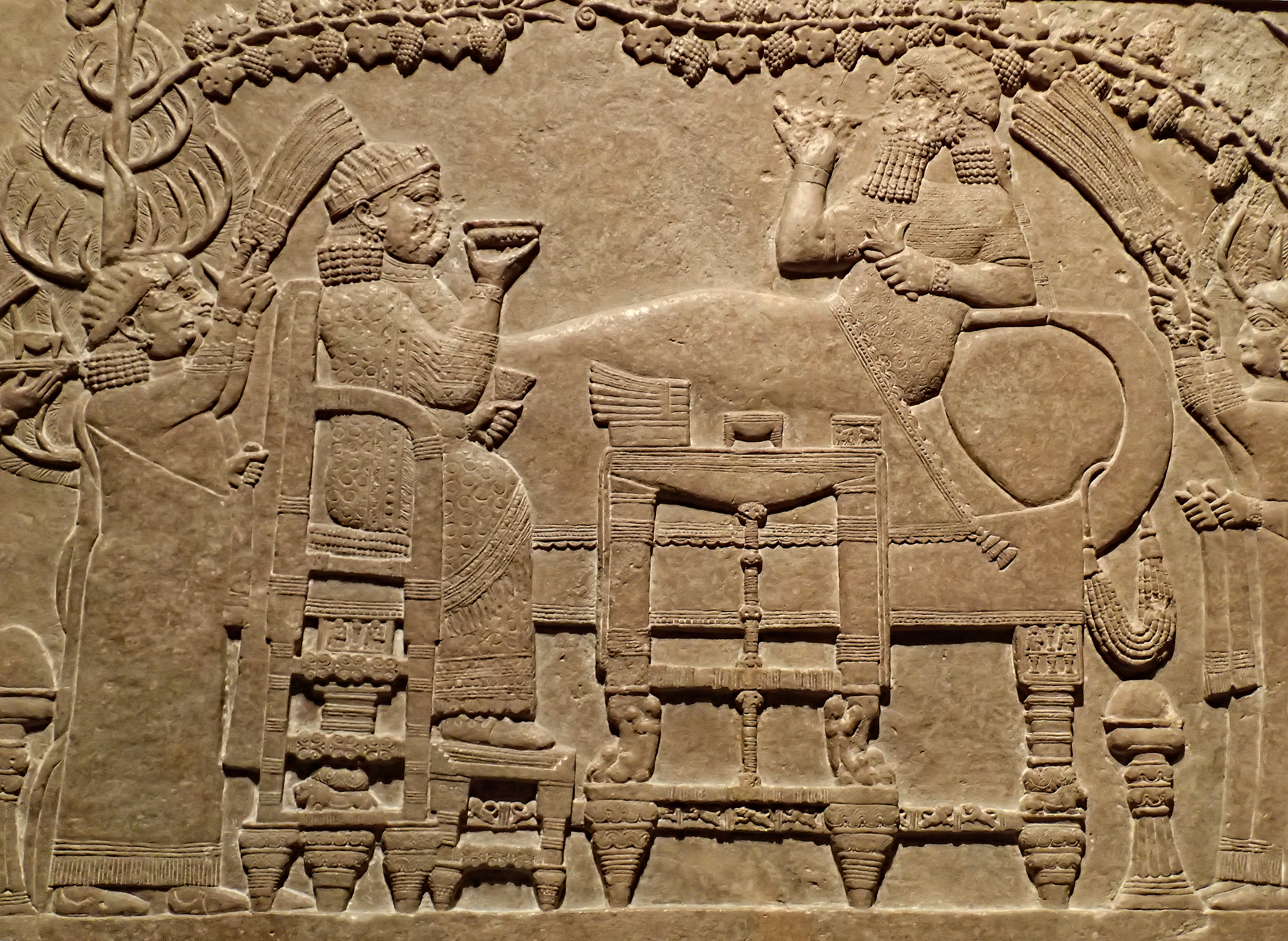
The "Garden Party" relief from Nineveh, depicting the Neo-Assyrian queen Libbali-sharrat (left) dining with her husband, the king Ashurbanipal (right; r. 669–631 BC)

The queen (Assyrian: issi ekalli or sēgallu, lit. 'Woman of the Palace') of the Neo-Assyrian Empire was the consort of the Neo-Assyrian king. Though the queens derived their power and influence through their association with their husband, they were not pawns without political power. The queens oversaw their own, often considerable, finances and owned vast estates throughout the empire. To oversee their assets, the queens employed a large administrative staff headed by a set of female administrators called šakintu. Among the duties of the queens were religious responsibilities and overseeing parts of the royal palaces; their role as "rulers of the domestic realm" is reflected in their title as "Women of the Palace". The power and influence of the queens was increased further under the Sargonid dynasty (722–609 BC), when they more frequently appear in artwork and large military units directly subservient to the queen were created.

The most famous and powerful Neo-Assyrian queen was Shammuramat, who for a time might have served as regent for her young son Adad-nirari III after the death of her husband Shamshi-Adad V in 811 BC. Shammuramat is also recorded to have accompanied her son on military campaigns. The tombs and remains of numerous queens have been found through excavations of the Queens' tombs at Nimrud, which has given considerable insight into their lives as well as their attire and regalia.

== Status and role ==
=== Title and symbol of the queen ===
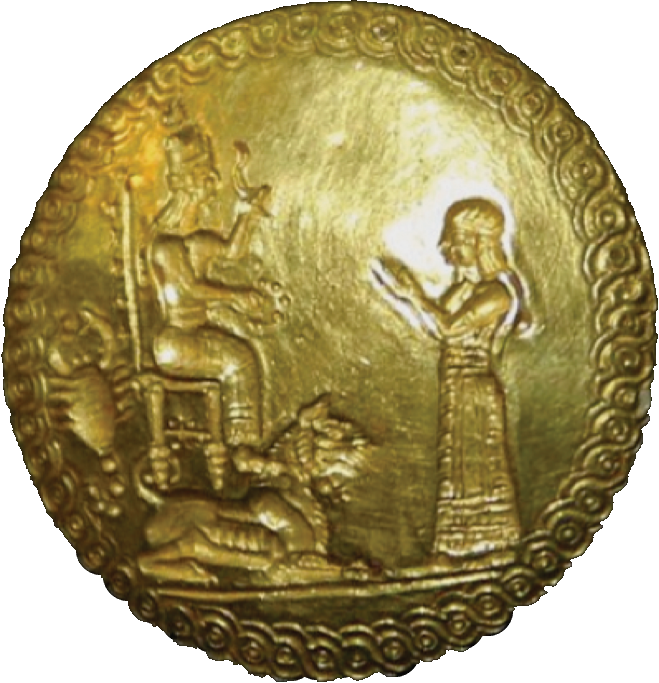
Seal of Hama, the queen of Shalmaneser IV (r. 783–773 BC). She is depicted (right) in reverence before a goddess (left). Note the scorpion symbol behind the goddess, a commonly used symbol for queens.

The Akkadian cuneiform term used to designate the queen in the Neo-Assyrian Empire was mí.é.gal, munus.é.gal or mí.kur, which would be rendered in Assyrian as issi ekalli, literally meaning "Woman of the Palace". (Note: The direct translation of the cuneiform signs is simply "woman" and "palace".) The term could also perhaps be abbeviated to sēgallu, with the same meaning. Modern historians recognize the Neo-Assyrian "Women of the Palace" as queens, though this diverges from the ancient Assyrian terminology. The feminine version of the word for "king" (šarru) was šarratu, but this term was only applied to goddesses and queens of foreign nations who ruled in their own right. Since the Assyrian consorts did not rule themselves, the Assyrians did not refer to them as šarratu. The difference in terminology does not necessarily mean that foreign queens, who often governed significantly smaller territories than the Neo-Assyrian Empire, were seen as having a higher status than the Assyrian queens. Still, a handful of modern historians, such as Sarah C. Melville, prefer to designate the Assyrian queens simply as "wives" or "consorts". The title of "Woman of the Palace" was a new invention of the Neo-Assyrian period; in the Middle Assyrian Empire, which directly preceded the Neo-Assyrian Empire, queens were designated as aššat šarre ("Wife of the King").

As the Neo-Assyrian period progressed, further titles were introduced for royal women, perhaps in response to confusing situations that could arise in regard to what former queens and wives of other members of the royal family should be called. Under Sargon II (r. 722–705 BC), the title bēlat bēti ("Lady of the House") was introduced for the wife of the crown prince. The title ummi šari ("Mother of the King") is attested first under Sargon's successor Sennacherib (r. 705–681 BC), and might best be understood as equating to the position of Queen mother, i.e. a former queen who was also the mother of the current king. The ummi šari could retain a prominent position for life; Naqi'a, wife of Sennacherib and mother of his successor Esarhaddon (r. 681–669 BC), was still attested with the title of ummi šari in the reign of her grandson Ashurbanipal (r. 669–631 BC), despite no longer being the mother of the reigning king.

A frequently used symbol, apparently the royal symbol of the queens themselves, that was used in documents and on objects to designate the queens was a scorpion. In Mesopotamian art, scorpions were closely connected with fertility and they are known from artwork as a religious symbol from prehistoric times. Another possible association was that the scorpion symbol represented the queen as a fierce and ideal mother; the term for a female scorpion was tārit zuqaqīpi (lit. 'she who picks up the scorpion'), closely related to the term tarû ("to arise, to pick up", also used in the meaning of "child-nurse" or "nanny").

=== Position and power ===
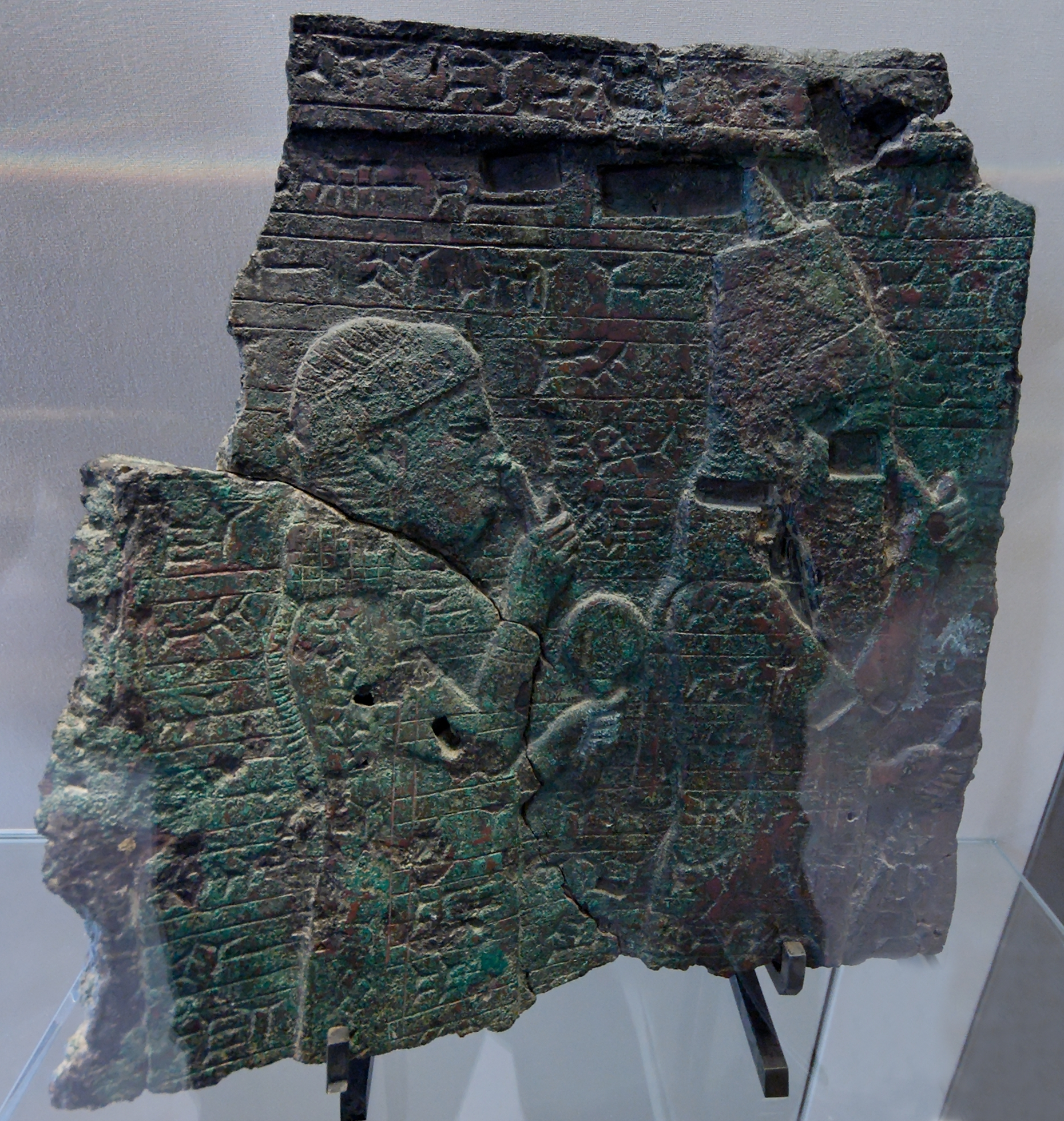
Relief depicting Esarhaddon (r. 681–669 BC; right) and his mother Naqi'a (left)

Though the queens, like all other female and male members of the royal court, ultimately derived their power and influence from their association with the king, they were not pawns without political power. The queens had their own say in financial affairs and while they ideally were supposed to produce an heir to the throne, they also had several other duties and responsibilities, often in very high levels of the government. The Neo-Assyrian queens are recorded to have been involved in arranging religious activities, such as rituals, and to have supported temples financially and dedicated gifts to the gods. It is also clear that they played a role in making political decisions. The queens commanded the respect of numerous high-ranking officials and had their own considerable financial resources, evidenced not only by surviving texts concerning their household and activities but also the treasures uncovered in their tombs. It is clear that the queens were prominent in Assyrian society since there is ample evidence of the kings giving them particular recognition. Sennacherib in inscriptions concerning the construction of palaces at Nineveh publicly described his queen Tashmetu-sharrat as his "beloved wife, whose features [the goddess] Belit-ili has made perfect above all women". When Esarhaddon's wife Esharra-hammat died, he constructed a great mausoleum in her honor.

The queens employed their own extensive staff and the administrative unit of their households was an integral part of the administration of the empire until its fall. The queen's household held extensive swaths of land and many offices throughout the Neo-Assyrian Empire and employed hundreds of people. The queen's staff was headed by a set of female administrators, titled šakintu, who themselves had considerable resources and their own large staffs. It is probable that the šakintu ran the provincial holdings of the queens relatively autonomously. Among the staff of the šakintu were both men and women, with positions such as village managers, palace overseers, chief bakers and treasurers, as well as workers such as weavers, shepherds and leatherworkers. It is possible that the main enterprise of the many holdings was textile production, meant to supply textiles both the royal palace in the capital and for trading purposes. In the reign of Sargon II, military units subservient to the queen were created. Perhaps worried of the authority of the Turtanu (commander-in-chief), Sargon also split that office into two, one Turtanu being assigned to the queen's forces. Under the later kings of the Sargonid dynasty, the troops assigned to the queen grew more numerous and diverse; it was not limited simply to bodyguards; among the queen's troops were cohorts of infantry, chariots and several commanders. Some of the queen's troops are attested as taking part in military campaigns, which means that they were not simply the honor guard of the queens but also a part of the military might of the empire.

The title "Woman of the Palace" places greater emphasis on the queen's role in regard to the royal palace than her association with the king, which implies that their role as "rulers over the domestic realm" was more important than that they were the chief consorts of the kings. Further indicating their strong association with the palace was that the Queens' tombs at Nimrud, containing the remains of several queens, were found beneath the floor of one of the royal palaces in the then capital city of Nimrud; the queens were thus buried in the palace, not alongside the kings in the royal tombs of Assur, Assyria's religious and ceremonial center. (Note: Burying the queens beneath the floor of the palace was not a sign of disrespect; it was a common practice in the Ancient Near East to bury your ancestors beneath the floors of your home.)

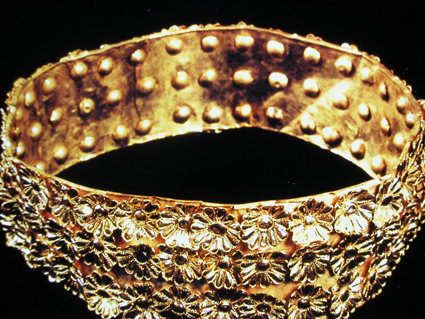
Golden crown found in the tomb of queens Iaba, Banitu and Atalia. This particular crown is evocative of headgear depicted in Levantine art.

Though reign of Esarhaddon was in particular a time when royal women were able to exercise great political power, perhaps on account of Esarhaddon's distrust of his male relatives, there were powerful women in the empire before that point as well. The most powerful and famous Neo-Assyrian queen was Shammuramat, the wife of Shamshi-Adad V (r. 824–811 BC). Though references to her are scant from the reign of her husband, Shammuramat reached a position of power upon his death and the accession of their son Adad-nirari III (r. 811–783 BC). Adad-nirari III was quite young at the time of his accession and a handful of sources from his early reign continued to refer to Shammuramat as queen, perhaps suggesting that she ruled in her own right as regent. An inscription on a boundary stone suggests that Shammuramat herself partook in a military campaign with her son. In later legends Shammuramat was immortalized as the legendary queen Semiramis. Esarhaddon's mother Naqi'a was also very powerful after Sennacherib's death; she owned her own residencies in most of the major Assyrian cities, was likely extremely wealthy and on her own accord commissioned a new palace for her son in Nineveh.

=== Scholarly disputes and issues ===
It is not clear how exactly the position of queen was connected to the position of king. While the queen most for the majority of the time have been the consort of the king, there is scholarly dispute in regards to whether the queen retained her title and status after the death of the king, or whether the title and position was automatically and directly transferred to the wife of the succeeding king. Most historians support the idea that the title only applied to the primary wife of the reigning king, with the title not being retained upon the death of the king.

Some scholars have suggested, based on issues with identifying queens from administrative documents, that there could perhaps be multiple women with the title "Women of the Palace" at any one given time. In 2004, Sarah C. Melville suggested that the term was used differently within and outside the royal palace, with there only being one "Woman of the Palace" in regard to the empire but that multiple women could carry the title while within the royal palace. Although Assyrian kings are known to have had multiple wives, or at least female partners, there are serious problems with the idea of multiple "Women of the Palace". Most importantly, Assyrian documents always use the term without any further qualifiers, which suggests that it referred unambiguously to the main wife of the king. Most historians support the idea that there was only one "Woman of the Palace" at any one given time. Scholarly investigations are made more difficult by there not being any concrete remaining textual evidence describing the royal wedding ceremony, nor listing the number of royal wives.

== Attire and regalia ==
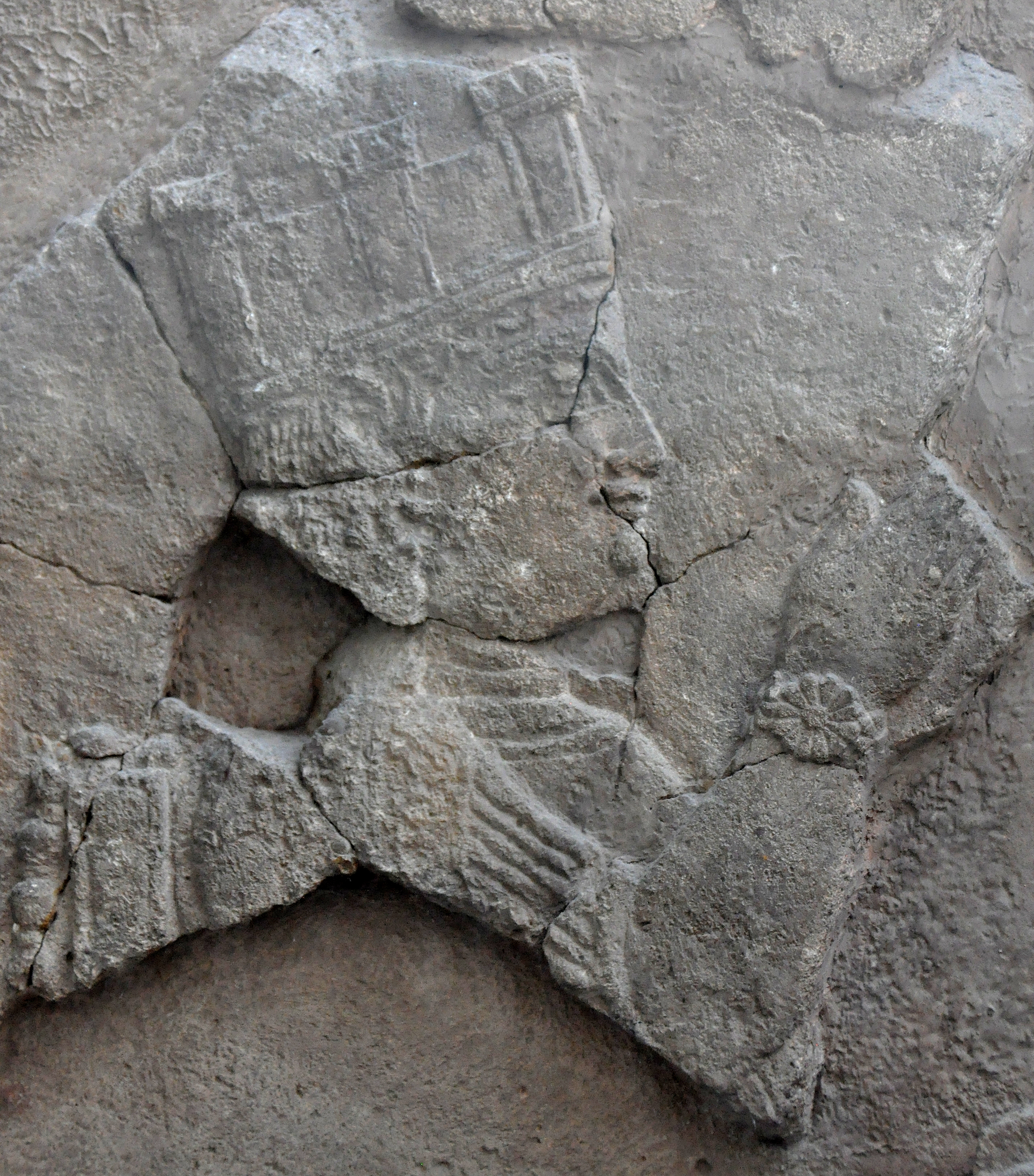
Detail of a stele depicting Libbali-sharrat, queen of Ashurbanipal, showing her wearing the mural crown

The Assyrian queens wore crowns, though they differed in appearance from those of their husbands. Their crown is typically referred to by modern scholars as the mural crown, as it incorporates elements designed to evoke a castle wall. In ancient Assyria, this crown was referred to as kilīlu ("battlements"). The crown, a highly unusual design in Mesopotamia, was a band, well-fitted on the queen's head, decorated at regular intervals with tower-shaped protrusions slightly higher than the rest of the crown. The mural crown probably had strong political value and was perhaps an important symbol of female power. Queens are sometimes depicted without their crowns in artwork, though this is normally in contexts where wearing a crown would have been inappropriate, such as in religious or cultic imagery. In such contexts, the queens could wear more modest regalia, such as a plain headband.

It is probable that the royal attire of the queens was inspired by Mesopotamian mythology; in the myth of Ishtar's descent into the underworld, the attire of the goddess Ishtar is described very similarly to what is known of the attire of the Neo-Assyrian queens. Given that Ishtar was partly a goddess of fertility, it is possible that the dress in turn also referenced fertility. The strongest similarity to Ishtar was that the goddess in Assyrian art also wore the mural crown. This suggests that the queen may ideologically have been an image of Ishtar, and that she at times could be seen as an incarnation of the goddess.

Reconstruction of the attire and regalia of a Neo-Assyrian queen, based on the finds in the Queens' tombs at Nimrud

The Queens' tombs at Nimrud preserve large sets of royal regalia. For individual queens, the typical ensemble included a headdress or crown, necklaces, earrings, bracelets, beads, up to ten rings, gold decorations, one or several seals and a mirror. The details on all objects differed from queen to queen, which indicates individual identity and that they were also uniquely dressed in life. In terms of iconography, the jewelry of the queens incorporated both aspects of Assyrian royal tradition (such as eyestones) and elements derived from foreign sources (such as gold, agate and carnelian; perhaps an expression of the breadth and dominance of the Neo-Assyrian Empire. Many of the dress and regalia elements found in the tomb agree well with the known depictions of queens, such as their earrings and bracelets, but discrepancies with the artwork also exist. Most prominently, no mural crown, the most evocative artistic indication of queenship, has ever been found. Instead, the queens buried at Nimrud were buried with other headdresses. Perhaps the mural crown was not as central to queenship as artistic depictions would suggest or alternatively, the mural crown was belonged to a "crown treasury" and was not part of the queen's personal belongings and could thus not be placed in a tomb.

== Sources ==
Surviving source material in regards to individual Assyrian queens is very scarce; while alive, queens appear to rarely have been designated by name and as such, the majority of available references concerning them are funerary texts and inscriptions. The names of many queens thus remain unknown. The most extensive information concerning the queens has been recovered from the Queens' tombs at Nimrud, discovered in 1988. Often, very little historical information is available for each queen. The earliest queen known from the Neo-Assyrian period, Mullissu-mukannishat-Ninua (wife of Ashurnasirpal II) is the only of the queens for whom any details of her family history are known for certain; her funerary inscription mentions that her father was Ashur-nirka-da’’inni, the "great cupbearer" of Ashurnasirpal.

In contrast to the scarce record of the names of the queens, queens are frequently attested in administrative documents without their names. Such documents provide insight into their households, position and status, but it can be difficult to identify which queen they belong to. The known documents mentioning queens amount to nearly 200 texts, distributed in time from 844 BC to the fall of the capital city (Note: The Assyrian capital was transferred from Nimrud to Nineveh under Sennacherib.) of Nineveh in 612 BC.

== Presence in art ==
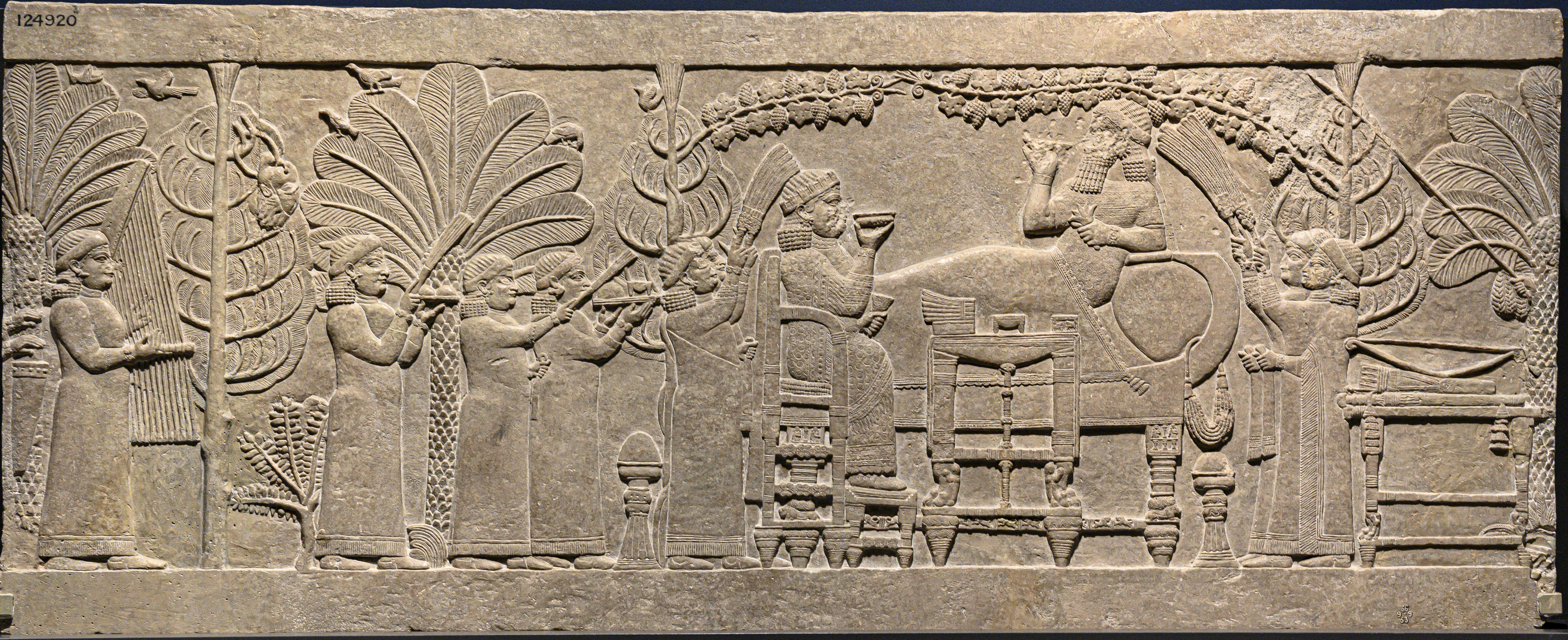
The entire "Garden Party" relief, showing the royal couple and the surrounding scene

Though many artistic depictions of kings and male officials survive from the Neo-Assyrian Empire, few depictions of queens are known. This is not necessarily an indication that they were not important, but could rather be understood as a measure taken to ensure the security of the royal women; a significant number of surviving texts illustrate that the Assyrians believed that any negative act done towards an image would have detrimental effects for the person it portrayed.

The most famous Neo-Assyrian artwork depicting a queen is the "Garden Party" relief of Ashurbanipal, which depicts the king reclining on a couch while his queen, Libbali-sharrat, sits opposite him in a high chair. The couple are attended by servants and are depicting raising their cups in commemoration of Ashurbanipal's victories against the Elamites. While the relief depicts Ashurbanipal as of higher rank through depicting him higher up and as larger, Libbali-sharrat is also shown as being of exceptionally high rank since she is closely affiliated with the king and her robe and jewelry, parallelling that of the king's, evoke divine imagery. Some striking details concerning the "Garden Party" relief is that while Libbali-sharrat is depicted with the mural crown, Ashurbanipal is uncrowned (save for a simple headband) and the king is reclining whereas the queen is seated; sitting on a throne was a royal privilege. The servants depicted in the image are also all female, i.e. part of Libbali-sharrat's staff. Taken together, these artistic choices mean that the scene is actually organized around Libbali-sharrat rather than Ashurbanipal; it is the only known surviving image from ancient Assyria depicting an individual other than the king effectively holding court.

== List of queens ==
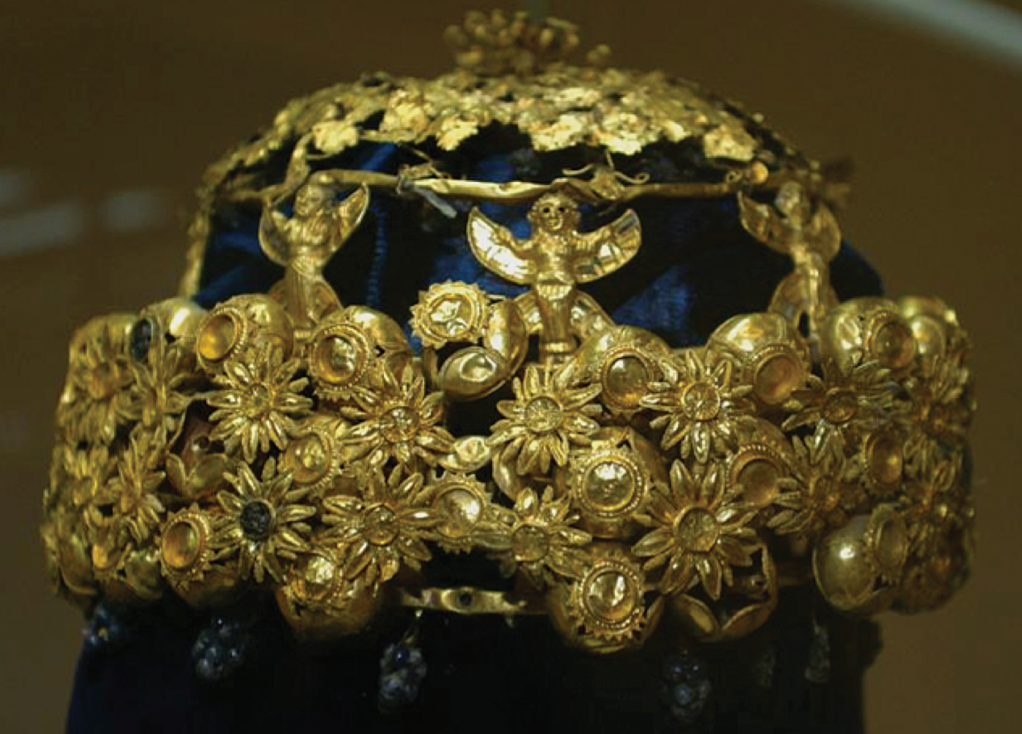
Golden crown found in the tomb of Hama

=== Queens known by name ===
- Mullissu-mukannishat-Ninua (Mullissu-mukannišat-Nīnua), queen of Ashurnasirpal II (r. 883–859 BC)
- Shammuramat (Sammu-rāmat), queen of Shamshi-Adad V (r. 824–811 BC)
- Hama (Ḫamâ), queen of Shalmaneser IV (r. 783–773 BC)
- Iaba (Iabâ), queen of Tiglath-Pileser III (r. 745–727 BC)
- Banitu (Note: Some researchers hypothesize that Banitu and Iaba were the same person, with Banitu being Iaba's name in Akkadian. Historical and chonological evidence speaks against identifying them as the same person.) (Banītu), queen of Shalmaneser V (r. 727–722 BC)
- Atalia (Atalia), queen of Sargon II (r. 722–705 BC) (Note: Sargon II also had another wife, Ra'ima, who was the mother of his successor Sennacherib. There are references to a "queen mother" from Sennacherib's reign, indicating that Ra'ima was still alive after Sargon's death. There is however no evidence that she was ever Sargon's queen, and the style "queen mother" may have been applied to her only after his death, by Sennacherib.)
- Tashmetu-sharrat (Tašmētu-šarrat), queen of Sennacherib (r. 705–681 BC)
- (?) Naqi'a (Naqī'a), possibly another queen of Sennacherib (Note: Naqi'a is attested as "Mother of the King" in the reign of Esarhaddon but it is unclear if she ever held the position of "Woman of the Palace". To be Esarhaddon's mother she must have given birth to him c. 713 BC, but in 694 BC (when Naqi'a must still have been alive) Tashmetu-sharrat is known to have been Sennacherib's queen.)
- Esharra-hammat (Ešarra-ḫammat), queen of Esarhaddon (r. 681–669 BC)
- Libbali-sharrat (Libbali-šarrat), queen of Ashurbanipal (r. 669–631 BC)
- Ana-Tashmetum-taklak (Ana-Tašmētum-taklāk), known from a fragmentary inscription. Queen at some point after the reign of Sennacherib (due to being attested at Nineveh, made the capital under Sennacherib). Possibly the same person as one of the otherwise unknown queens of Ashur-etil-ilani or Sinsharishkun.

=== Queens not known by name ===
- Queen of Shalmaneser III (r. 859–824 BC), attested through three inscriptions mentioning a queen
- Queen of Adad-nirari III (r. 811–783 BC), possibly attested by some inscriptions mentioning a queen
- Queen of Ashur-dan III (r. 773–755 BC), attested through three inscriptions mentioning a queen
- Queen of Ashur-nirari V (r. 755–745 BC), attested through five inscriptions mentioning a queen
- Queen of Ashur-etil-ilani (r. 631–627 BC), attested through two inscriptions mentioning a queen
- Queen of Sinsharishkun (r. 627–612 BC), attested through six inscriptions mentioning a queen
