= Hama (queen) =

Ancient Assyrian queen

- Woman of the Palace (Note: Though usually used by historians today, the title of "queen" as such did not exist in the Neo-Assyrian Empire. The feminine version of the word for king (šarrum) was šarratum, but this was reserved for goddesses and foreign queens who ruled in their own right. Because the consorts of the kings did not rule themselves, they were not regarded as their equals and as such not called šarratum. Instead, the term reserved for the primary consort was MUNUS É.GAL (woman of the palace). In Assyrian, this term was rendered issi ekalli, later abbreviated to sēgallu.)
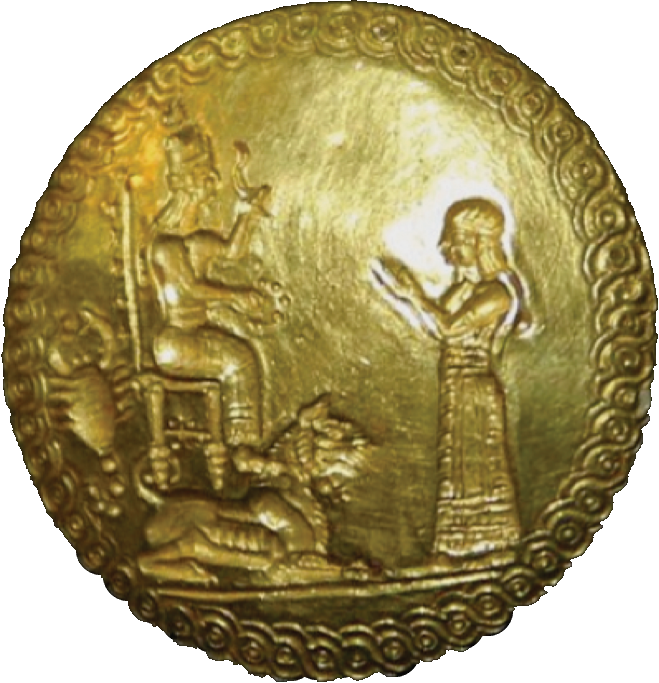
- Golden seal of Hama, depicting the queen (right) in reverence before a goddess
- Born: Between c. 799 and c. 791 BC
- Died: Between c. 779 and c. 773 BC (aged 18–20); Nimrud
- Burial: Queens' tombs at Nimrud
- Spouse: Shalmaneser IV
- Akkadian: Ḫamâ

Hama (Neo-Assyrian cuneiform: Ḫamâ) was a queen of the Neo-Assyrian Empire as the primary consort (Note: Assyrian kings at times had multiple wives at the same time, but not all were recognized as queens (or "women of the palace"). Though it has been disputed in the past, it appears that only one woman bore the title at any given time, as the term typically appears without qualifiers (indicating a lack of ambiguity).) of Shalmaneser IV (r. 783–773 BC). Historical records reveal next to nothing about Hama, and the vast majority of the information known about the queen comes from studies on her skeletal remains and the contents of the bronze coffin she was buried in, discovered by modern researchers in 1988 but not securely identified as Hama until 2017. Hama's skeleton indicates that she died at a young age, at some point between the age of 18 and 20, and that she suffered from some mild health issues, including gingivitis, dental plaque and chronic sinusitis.

After her death, Hama was buried among the tombs of other Assyrian queens at Nimrud, the Assyrian capital. Her coffin was discovered in the entryway to a greater tomb; this was likely not its intended final resting place but possibly a temporary solution, as she died young and a proper tomb might not have been available yet. Hama was buried alongside some of the most spectacular treasures of the royal tombs, including a vast number of gold items. Out of these gold items, the treasures that have received the most attention from modern historians are her seal (in the form of a necklace) and her golden crown.

== Life ==
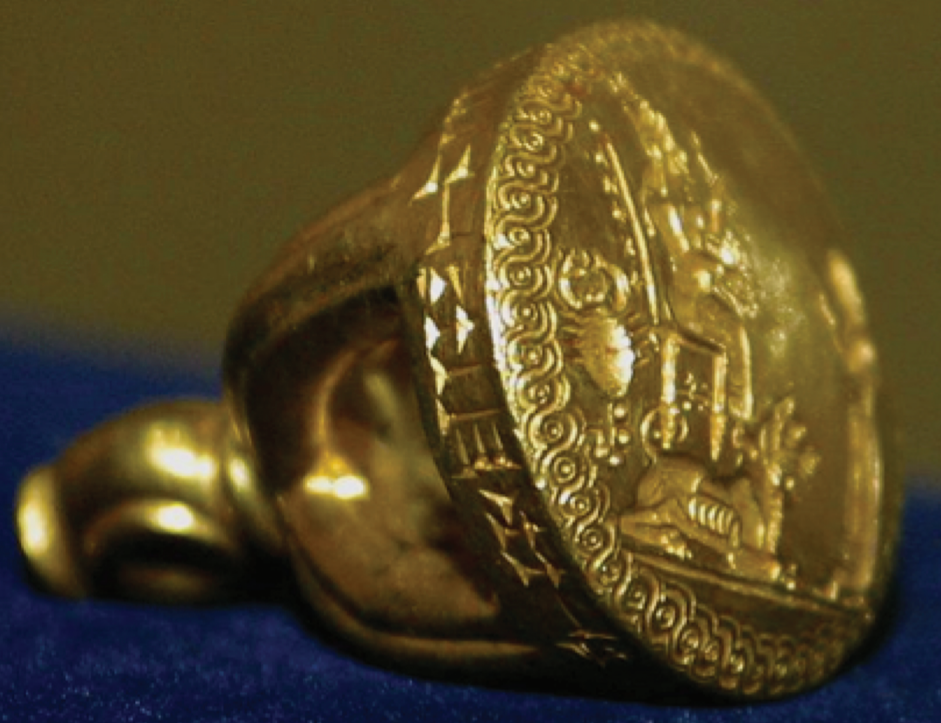
Side-view of Hama's seal

The name Hama, Ḫamâ in Akkadian, is not known to have been borne by any other Assyrian individual as a personal name. It is possible that it was a nickname, as it etymologically might derive either from the Akkadian ḫamû ("to become confident") or the Semitic ʿm(m) ("kin"). Hama is not identified by name in any other sources than her tomb.

Features of Hama's bones indicate that she underwent a period of severe trauma or illness at some point between the ages of three and six. These features are growth arrest lines on her right tibia, indicating a temporary disruption in bone cell growth, as well as enamel hypoplasia on several of her teeth, indicating that she experienced stress during childhood. What caused the stress and disruption is impossible to determine, but possible explanations include deficiencies in hormones or nutrition, infectious disease or tumors. Whatever the cause, Hama managed to overcome it and live a relatively normal life.

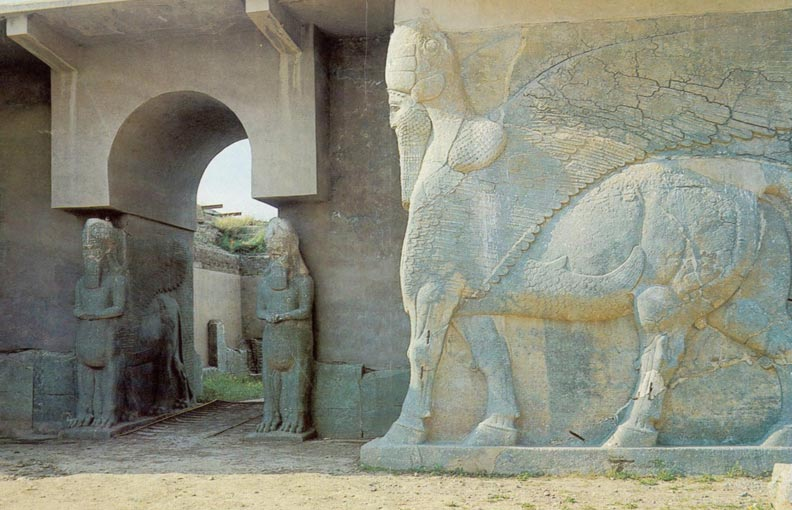
Ruins of one of the entrances of the Northwest Palace at Nimrud, destroyed by the Islamic State in 2015

Hama married Shalmaneser IV (r. 783–773 BC) before he became king, given that an inscription from the reign of Shalmaneser's father, Adad-nirari III (r. 811–783 BC), mentions Adad-nirari's daughter-in-law. Shalmaneser ruled Assyria during an obscure period from which little information survives. At this time, the Neo-Assyrian Empire is believed to have undergone a period of decline, as officials became more powerful relative to the king and Assyria's enemies grew more powerful. Historical information concerning Hama and her life is extremely scant, not only because of the low number of sources from the period but also because Assyrian texts typically refer to queens not by name but by title (making it hard to determine which queen is mentioned in any given text). Only a single text that references her has been securely dated: a 779 BC legal document where listed witnesses include the queen's servant, the queen's household overseer and the queen's leatherworker. Another text, which mentions the queen's village manager and shepherd, might date to Hama's time as queen but the year is damaged and it is unclear whether it is from 793 BC or 773 BC.

Hama was approximately 157.5 centimeters (5 feet and 2 inches) tall. She suffered from some minor health issues throughout her life, including minor dental and nasal problems. These included gingivitis (inflammation of the gums), dental plaque (biofilm on the teeth) and chronic sinusitis (inflammation in the sinuses). None of these ailments were particularly serious, and they were fairly common in Mesopotamia.

During her time as queen, Hama lived in the Northwest Palace in Nimrud. Nimrud had been made the capital of Assyria in the reign of Ashurnasirpal II (r. 883–859 BC), who was also responsible for constructing the Northwest Palace. This great palace was placed on a large mound and overlooked the entire city. Hama must have died during her husband's reign or shortly thereafter. She was very young at the time of her death, only somewhere between 18 and 20 years old, which makes it more likely that she died during her husband's reign (in order to account for how old she would have been at the time of their marriage). Her bones do not give any insight into the cause of her death.

== Legacy ==
=== Burial ===
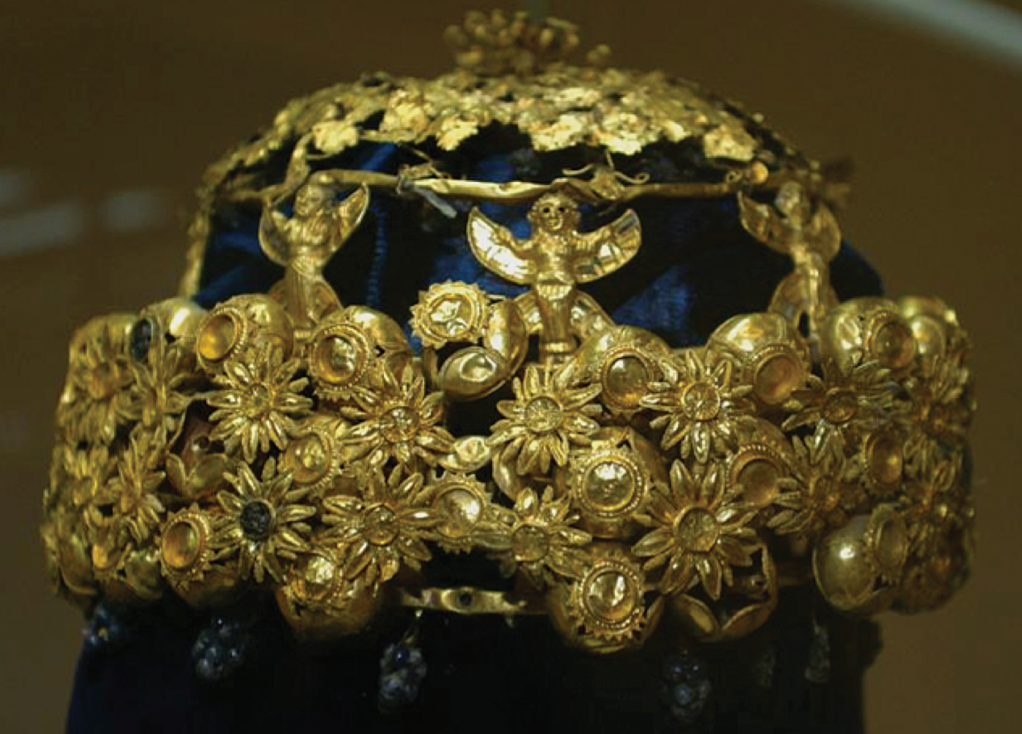
Hama's golden crown, found placed on her head

Hama was buried in the Northwest Palace. She was buried alongside a set of other tombs of queens, in a vaulted chamber under the floor of the residential quarters of the palace. This set of tombs, constructed purposely in advance of the deaths of the queens, began construction under Ashurnasirpal II and his son Shalmaneser III (r. 859–824 BC), and remained in use until the reign of Sargon II (r. 722–705 BC), whose queen Ataliya was buried there. Burying the queens in a sealed chamber beneath the floor of the palace, rather than together with their husbands in Assur (the empire's ceremonial and religious capital), was not due to a lack of respect. It was common in ancient Mesopotamia to bury ancestors under the floor of your house. Burying them within the palace itself also reflected their title (woman of the palace) and their role as heads of the domestic royal palace life.

Hama was buried in a bronze coffin, which was later found placed against the east wall of the antechamber (entryway) to the chamber housing the sarcophagus of Mullissu-mukannishat-Ninua, the queen of Ashurnasirpal II. It is impossible to determine whether the coffin was originally placed there or was moved there later, but in any case it was likely not the intended final resting place, since the coffin partially obstructed the entryway to Mullissu-mukannishat-Ninua's tomb. Hama's young age at death suggests dying suddenly, which might explain her being buried in a bronze coffin and not a stone sarcophagus (as some of the other queens) and possibly the odd location of the coffin (as a placement intended to be temporary until a new tomb could be constructed, all existing vaulted tombs in the chamber being occupied).

Hama was buried alongside some of the most spectacular treasures known from the royal tombs, indicating great relevance and importance. These included, most famously, a golden crown made up of leaves, female winged genies, grapes and flowers. Alongside the crown are also a large amount of jewels and gems and various other golden objects, such as cups, leaves, brooches, rings, anklets, bracelets, bowls and pots. A golden pendant was placed around Hama's neck, made as a stamp seal, with a cuneiform text reading "Belonging to Hama, queen of Shalmaneser, king of Assyria, daughter-in-law of Adad-nirari." Pictured on the seal is Hama, standing in reverence in front of a goddess, probably either Mullissu or Gula. The crown, rings, bracelets and other wearable treasures were worn by Hama upon her burial and she was most likely buried on her side with her knees tucked in. Her burial might have been rushed due to her death being unexpected and ill prepared for. This is indicated by the presence of an unusual assortment of funerary items, including seals and a gold cup depicting scenes of a king doing battle, suggesting that palace officials scrambled to assemble whatever they could get.

At some point, another bronze coffin was for some reason placed on top of Hama's coffin. The bones recovered from Hama's coffin also include the skeletal remains of a young child, aged 6–12 years old, but as these bones are only composed of fragments and a single rib, it is unlikely that they were deposited at the same time as Hama's burial. It is possible that the bones were mistakenly added by modern researchers: the bones attributed to Hama's coffin also include miscellaneous bones of adult men and women (different individuals) that match the bones missing from Hama's skeleton, perhaps mistakenly added because researchers thought they were hers. It is not impossible that the bones of a child were mistakenly added in the same way.

=== Modern studies ===
The tomb of Hama, and those of the other queens, were uncovered during excavations at the Northwest Palace of Ashurnasirpal II in Nimrud in the late 1980s, by the Iraqi Department of Antiquities. While excavating portions of the residential quarters of the Northwest Palace in 1988, an unevenness of the floor was noted, and soon the chamber of tombs below was discovered. The tombs were excavated and examined 1988–1990. Although the tombs were immediately recognized as extraordinary on account of the great treasures contained within them, their discovery was soon overshadowed by the beginning of the Gulf War (1991), which meant that scientific study of the tombs thereafter was a slow process. Out of the more than two dozen individuals found in the tombs, many remain unidentified, given that inscriptions do not provide identifications for all the bodies and tombs. The individuals were spread out across four different chambers, buried in three bronze coffins, two clay coffins and three sarcophagi made of stone (several housed more than one body). When excavating the tombs in 1988–1990, archaeologists placed all the bones in plastic bags, each labelled after coffin or sarcophagus, and these bags were then stored in the Mosul Museum for a decade, preserved in resin coating to reduce the risk of the fragile remains deteriorating. Because she was buried in a bronze coffin, the bones of Hama had a green staining on them due to exposure to copper ions during decomposition. Because of the lack of textual sources discussing the queens, the sequence of Assyrian consorts is poorly known by historians. Hama is thus one of the very few queens for which a name is known at all.

Although the bronze coffin housing Hama's remains (designated Bronze Coffin 2) was discovered alongside the rest of the tombs in the 1980s, and the pendant with her name on it was found and translated, Hama was not securely identified as the queen buried in the coffin until a 2017 archaeological, skeletal and textual study by the historian Tracy L. Spurrier, primarily based on cross-referencing previous reports on the coffin's content. The pendant's importance was not noted in earnest until Spurrier's study, as it was erroneously presumed that the bones in Coffin 2 were a jumble of bones from different individuals (as in many of the other coffins). In 2015, the historian Yasmina Wicks even spoke against identifying the occupant of Coffin 2 as Hama: she did not believe the pendant was strong enough evidence, since it did not necessarily have to be buried with the person whose name it bore. Spurrier reinforced her identification of the body as belonging to Hama through the presence of a royal crown and the various other treasures (indicating royal status), as well as its placement within the tomb of another queen. Furthermore, Spurrier noted that a seal pendant was a very personal item. Coffin 2 also contains another inscribed object, a seal of the eunuch Ninurta-idīya-šukšid, a servant of Adad-nirari III, but the bones could be ruled out as belonging to him since they were from a young woman. Perhaps the eunuch's seal was a funerary gift. The idea that the female bones in Coffin 2 could have been reburied, and were originally interred somewhere else, was discarded by Spurrier, given that the green staining on the bones indicates that the body was in the bronze coffin throughout the entire decomposition process and the worn treasures (the crown, necklace, bracelets, etc.) were in locations that correspond to where they would have been worn. Other Assyriologists, including McGuire Gibson, David Kertai, Eckart Frahm and Frances Pinnock have found Spurrier's identification of the bones to be convincing. In conjunction with her study, Spurrier put together a small exhibit at the Robarts Library of the University of Toronto, called "Finding Hama: On the Identification of a Forgotten Queen Buried in the Nimrud Tombs." The exhibit garnered her the university's Graduate Student Exhibition Award, which recognizes effective uses of library resources.

Portions of the Northwest Palace, including Hama's bronze coffin, were destroyed by Islamic State fighters in 2015 using barrel bombs. The Mosul Museum was also attacked, which has left the status of Hama's remains and funerary belongings uncertain. According to Spurrier, the bones were last reported to have been in a bag in the Iraq Museum in the 1990s, and the gold and crown were photographed there by the American army in 2003, but as of 2019 she had been unable to get confirmation that the items were still in the museum's possession.
