= Tašmētu-šarrat =

Ancient Assyrian queen

Tashmetu-sharrat
- Woman of the Palace (Note: Though usually used by historians today, the title of "queen" as such did not exist in the Neo-Assyrian Empire. The feminine version of the word for king (šarrum) was šarratum, but this was reserved for goddesses and foreign queens who ruled in their own right. Because the consorts of the kings did not rule themselves, they were not regarded as their equals and as such not called šarratum. Instead, the term reserved for the primary consort was MUNUS É.GAL (woman of the palace). In Assyrian, this term was rendered issi ekalli, later abbreviated to sēgallu.)
- Died: Before 684 BC?
- Spouse: Sennacherib
- Akkadian: Tašmetu-šarrat or Tašmētum-šarrat

Tashmetu-sharrat (Akkadian: Tašmētu-šarrat or Tašmētum-šarrat, meaning "Tashmetum is queen") was a queen of the Neo-Assyrian Empire as the primary consort (Note: Assyrian kings at times had multiple wives at the same time, but not all were recognized as queens (or "women of the palace"). Though it has been disputed in the past, it appears that only one woman bore the title at any given time, as the term typically appears without qualifiers (indicating a lack of ambiguity).) of Sennacherib (r. 705–681 BC). Tashmetu-sharrat is mostly known from an inscription by Sennacherib which praises her great beauty and in which the king hopes to spend the rest of his life with her. It is not known which of Sennacherib's children were children of Tashmetu-sharrat; the king's successor Esarhaddon (r. 681–669 BC) was the son of Naqi'a, another woman.

== Life ==
Tashmetu-sharrat's name is Akkadian (the official language of ancient Assyria) and means "Tashmetum is queen". She was the first Assyrian queen since Mullissu-mukannishat-Ninua over a century prior to bear a name of certain Akkadian origin. Because the name includes the element šarrat ("queen"), it is possible that the name was assumed by the queen upon her marriage to Sennacherib; in that case, the choice of name was probably a highly conscious one, Tashmetum was in Mesopotamian mythology the consort of the god Nabu, who was closely associated with the Assyrian crown prince.

Tashmetu-sharrat was clearly an influential figure in the Neo-Assyrian Empire. Tashmetu-sharrat is known to have inscribed her name on votive vases donated to temples. Though these inscriptions only record her name and her position as Sennacherib's queen, their mere existence is significant since very few people in Assyria held prominent enough status to do such a thing. Tashmetu-sharrat is known from texts found at both Nineveh, the capital under Sennacherib, and Assur, the religious and ceremonial center of the empire; it is probable that she owned residences in both cities. The evidence from Assur is only in the form of two inscriptions on vases in a room of a palace, but the textual evidence from Nineveh is more comprehensive and revealing. A long and unique text inscribed near one of the entrances to a suite in the Southwest Palace of Nineveh, constructed by Sennacherib, includes great and public praise by the king for the queen. In the text, Sennacherib writes that he built this suite for his queen and ḫīrtu narāmtīya ("beloved spouse") Tashmetu-sharrat, praises her great beauty, and expresses his wish to live with her in the palace in ṭūb šīri u ḫūd libbi ("physical and emotional bliss") forever. The inscription can be securely dated to between 696 and 693 BC, when the palace was undergoing construction. The suite given to Tashmetu-sharrat does not appear to have been a residential one, but rather perhaps a hall intended for state activity related to her holdings in the empire, banquets and receptions.

It is not known when Tashmetu-sharrat married Sennacherib. Given that her name, if it was assumed upon their marriage, has associations with the Assyrian crown prince, she could have married Sennacherib before he became king. Though Riekele Borger suggested that the inscription from the Southwest Palace indicates that Tashmetu-sharrat, because of her beauty, was very young, there is no reason why Sennacherib would not be able to praise her looks even if she was in her thirties or forties. Sennacherib himself was about 50 years old at this point in time. In that case, she could have married him c. 720 BC and could thus very well have been the mother of his oldest children.

Tashmetu-sharrat's tenure as queen overlaps with Naqi'a, a today more famous consort of Sennacherib. Which children of Sennacherib were the children of which woman is not known, other than that his successor, Esarhaddon (r. 681–669 BC), was Naqi'a's son. Whether Naqi'a ever held the title of queen in Sennacherib's reign is unclear (there is no evidence that there were ever two queens simultaneously but the king could have multiple wives, out of which only one was the queen), she was associated with Sennacherib already in c. 713 BC, when Esarhaddon was born and reached a prominent position in Esarhaddon's reign. Naqi'a was at times referred to as queen in Esarhaddon's reign, but as she was Esarhaddon's mother, the title may have been bestowed upon her either late in Sennacherib's reign or by Esarhaddon. If Tashmetu-sharrat was alive until the end of Sennacherib's reign and beyond, her relationship with Naqi'a likely deteriorated after Naqi'a's son was chosen as crown prince in 684 BC. It is possible that she was already dead by that point, since no documents from Esarhaddon's reign mention her. A clay docket from Nineveh, dated to about one month prior to Sennacherib's death in 681 BC, bears the impression of a seal owned by an Assyrian queen, indicating that there was a queen at the time of Sennacherib's death. It is possible that this was Tashmetu-sharrat but it might also alternatively have been Naqi'a, promoted to queen after Tashmetu-sharrat's death. Eckart Frahm considers it probable that Naqi'a was the queen at the time of Esarhaddon's appointment as crown prince, and thus that Tashmetu-sharrat had died at that point in time.
