= Ešarra-ḫammat =

Ancient Assyrian queen

- Woman of the Palace (Note: Though usually used by historians today, the title of "queen" as such did not exist in the Neo-Assyrian Empire. The feminine version of the word for king (šarrum) was šarratum, but this was reserved for goddesses and foreign queens who ruled in their own right. Because the consorts of the kings did not rule themselves, they were not regarded as their equals and as such not called šarratum. Instead, the term reserved for the primary consort was MUNUS É.GAL (woman of the palace). In Assyrian, this term was rendered issi ekalli, later abbreviated to sēgallu.)
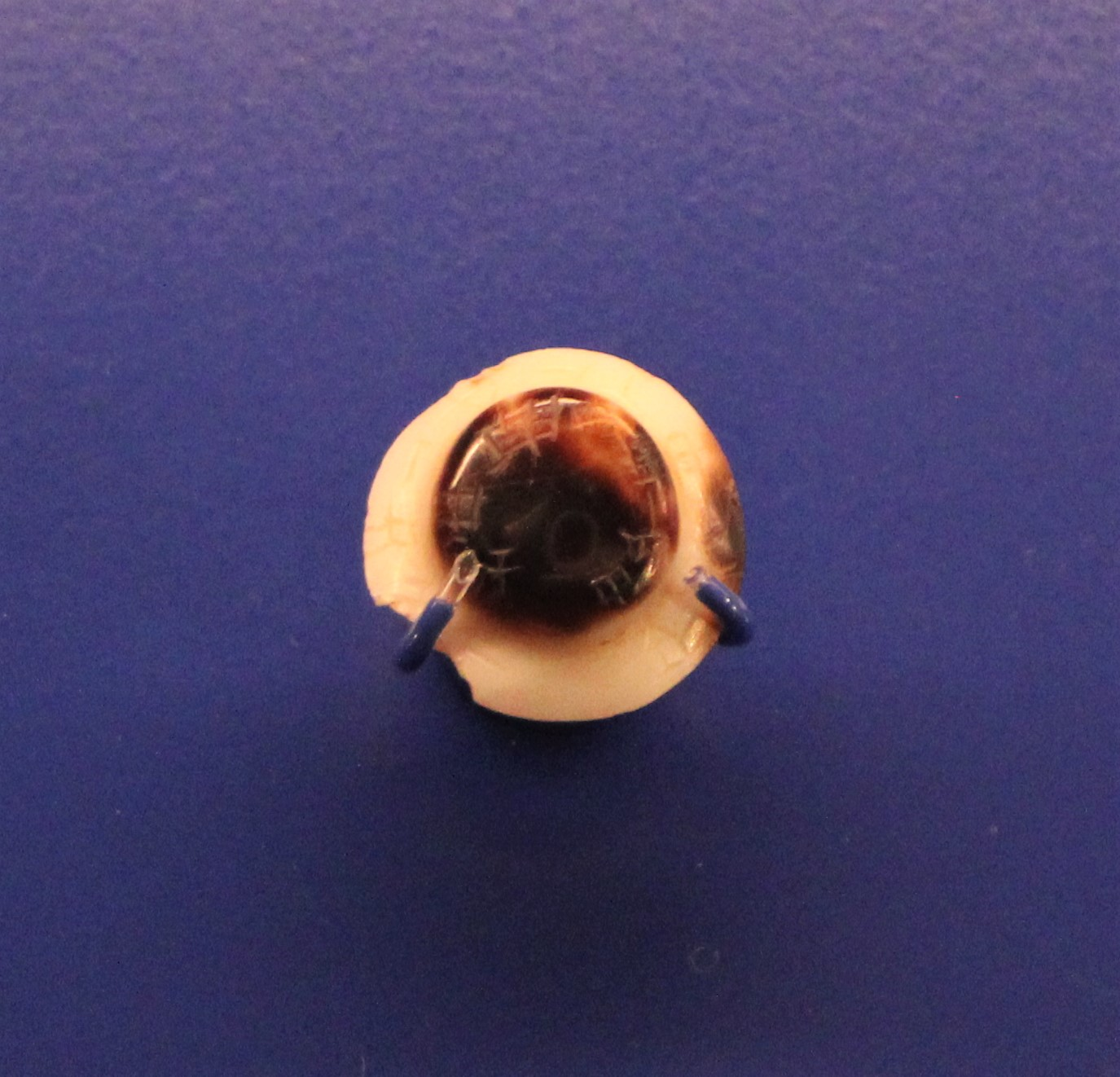
- Stone 'eye' (onyx) with cuneiform inscription, "(Property) of Ešarra-ḫammat, wife of Esarhaddon, king of Assyria." Ashmolean Museum.
- Born: c. 712 BC
- Died: February 672 BC (aged c. 40)
- Spouse: Esarhaddon
- Issue: Šērūʾa-ēṭirat (?); Shamash-shum-ukin (?); Ashurbanipal (?)
- Akkadian: Ešarra-ḫammat

Ešarra-ḫammat (Akkadian: Ešarra-ḫammat, meaning "Ešarra is mistress") was a queen of the Neo-Assyrian Empire as the primary consort (Note: Assyrian kings at times had multiple wives at the same time, but not all were recognized as queens (or "women of the palace"). Though it has been disputed in the past, it appears that only one woman bore the title at any given time, as the term typically appears without qualifiers (indicating a lack of ambiguity).) of Esarhaddon (r. 681–669 BC). Ešarra-ḫammat had been married to Esarhaddon for over a decade by the time he became king, having married him c. 695 BC. Few sources from Ešarra-ḫammat's lifetime that mention her are known, and she is thus chiefly known from sources dating to after her death in February 672 BC, an event which deeply affected Esarhaddon. Esarhaddon had a great mausoleum constructed for her, unusual for burials of Assyrian queens, and had her death recorded in the Babylonian Chronicles. Ešarra-ḫammat might have been the mother of Esarhaddon's most prominent children, i.e. the daughter Šērūʾa-ēṭirat and the sons Ashurbanipal and Shamash-shum-ukin.

== Life ==
Ešarra-ḫammat married Esarhaddon c. 695 BC. According to the Austrian British Assyriologist Gwendolyn Leick, Ešarra-ḫammat might have been of Babylonian ancestry. Ešarra-ḫammat is known mainly from commemorative documents and inscriptions written after her death. Among the few known inscriptions written by Ešarra-ḫammat (i.e. written when she was alive) is an inscription on an eye-stone marking it as her property.

Ešarra-ḫammat's name translated literally means "Ešarra is mistress". Ešarra was a temple, and in Mesopotamian cosmology, the name Ešarra was also applied to a heavenly cosmic location. The name is perhaps best interpreted as "[Mullissu of] Ešarra is mistress", referencing the goddess associated with the temple/realm. Alternative translations and interpretations include the name just referring to the temple/realm itself, or that it should be read "[Mullissu of] Ešarra gathers [all the powers]" or "[In] Ešarra, she is mistress". Given that no other individual by the name Ešarra-ḫammat is known, it is possible that the name was assumed by the future queen upon her marriage to Esarhaddon.

Ešarra-ḫammat died, probably aged about 40, in February 672 BC. She is the only known queen of Esarhaddon. Although Esarhaddon was also only about 40, and would rule for a few more years, no incumbent queen is known from the sources after his death, and the position is obviously absent from preserved lists of officials from this time. The death of Ešarra-ḫammat, which had shortly before been preceded by the death of one of their infant children, sank Esarhaddon into depression, and he did not choose a new queen. Instead, some of the queen's responsibilities and duties were assigned to Esarhaddon's mother, Naqiʾa. Though there are two surviving accounts of Ešarra-ḫammat's funeral and the rituals performed for her, her grave has not yet been located. This grave was not just a simple site, or placed within the palace (as was the case for some earlier queens); Esarhaddon had a great mausoleum constructed for Ešarra-ḫammat and he had her death recorded in the Babylonian Chronicles.

It is known that Esarhaddon had other wives than Ešarra-ḫammat, as his succession documents distinguish between the sons of "Ashurbanipal's mother" (Ashurbanipal being his son and successor) and the other sons. It is as such not known for certain which among Esarhaddon's at least 18 children were also Ešarra-ḫammat's children. It is possible that Esarhaddon's most prominent children, the eldest daughter Šērūʾa-ēṭirat and the sons Ashurbanipal and Shamash-shum-ukin, were Ešarra-ḫammat's children. Ešarra-ḫammat's funeral was a grand affair, in which multiple distinguished women from the court and elsewhere partook, including Ešarra-ḫammat's "daughter" and "daughter-in-law". In 2013, the Assyriologist David Kertai assumed the daughter to be Šērūʾa-ēṭirat, and suggested that the daughter-in-law could be Libbāli-šarrat, the wife of Ashurbanipal.

At some point after Ashurbanipal was proclaimed Esarhaddon's heir later in 672 BC, three months after Ešarra-ḫammat's death, Esarhaddon's chief exorcist Adad-šumu-uṣur reported to the king that Ešarra-ḫammat's ghost had appeared to Ashurbanipal to confirm his status as heir. Partially quoting Ashurbanipal's words, Adad-šumu-uṣur presented the following account:

"Ashur and Shamash ordained me to be the crown prince of Assyria because of her [Ešarra-ḫammat's] righteousness". (And) her ghost blesses him in the same degree as he has revered the ghost: "May his descendants rule over Assyria!"
