= Libbāli-šarrat =

Ancient Assyrian queen

- Woman of the Palace (Note: Though usually used by historians today, the title of "queen" as such did not exist in the Neo-Assyrian Empire. The feminine version of the word for king (šarrum) was šarratum, but this was reserved for goddesses and foreign queens who ruled in their own right. Because the consorts of the kings did not rule themselves, they were not regarded as their equals and as such not called šarratum. Instead, the term reserved for the primary consort was MUNUS É.GAL (woman of the palace). In Assyrian, this term was rendered issi ekalli, later abbreviated to sēgallu.)
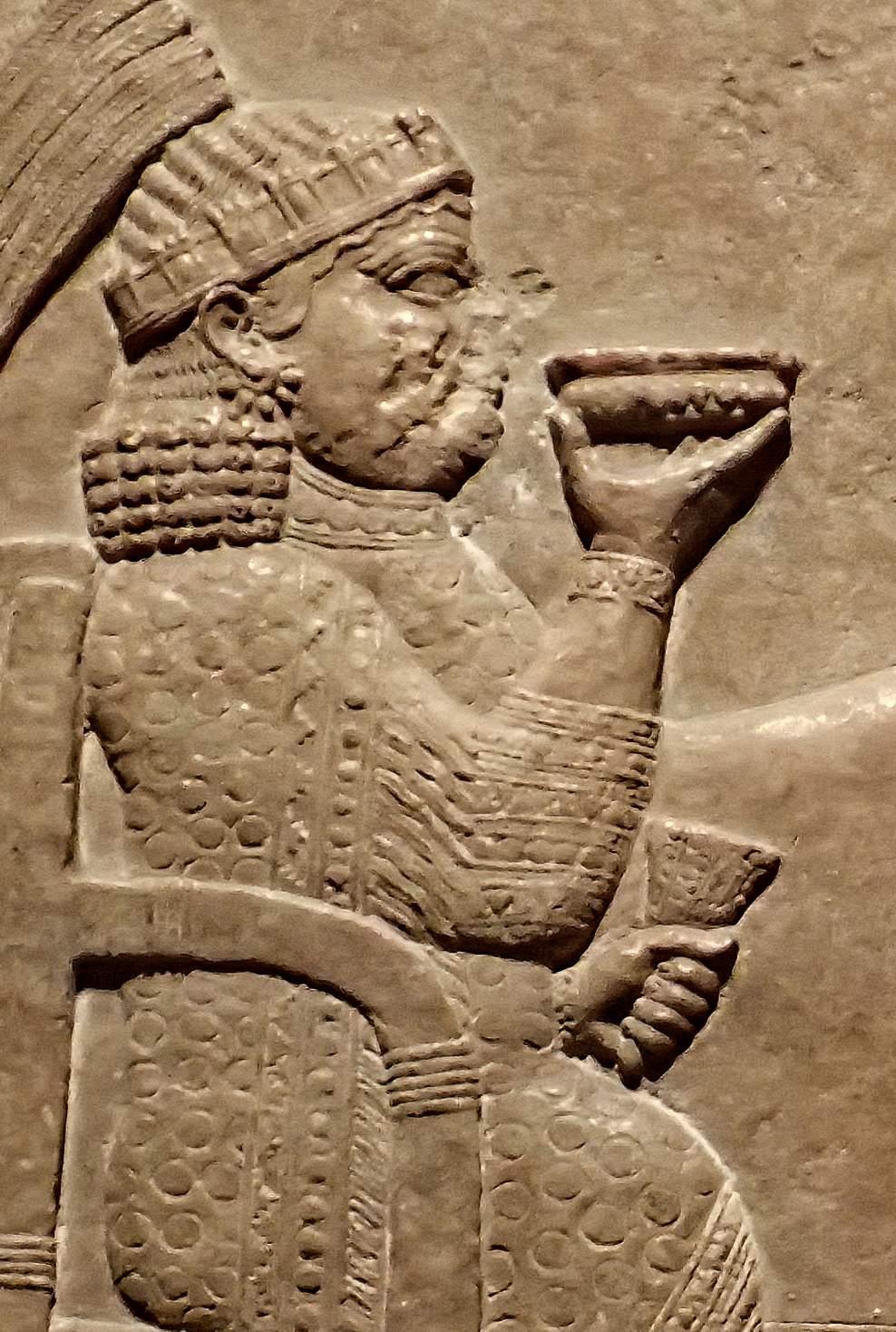
- Relief of Libbāli-šarrat from Nineveh, depicted dining
- Died: After 631 BC
- Spouse: Ashurbanipal
- Issue: Ashur-etil-ilani; Sinsharishkun
- Akkadian: Libbāli-šarrat

Libbāli-šarrat (Akkadian: Libbāli-šarrat, (Note: Libbāli-šarrat's name is in older scholarship sometimes wrongly transcribed as Aššur-šarrat).) meaning "the inner city [=Ishtar?] is queen") was a queen of the Neo-Assyrian Empire as the primary consort (Note: Assyrian kings at times had multiple wives at the same time, but not all were recognized as queens (or "women of the palace"). Though it has been disputed in the past, it appears that only one woman bore the title at any given time, as the term typically appears without qualifiers (indicating a lack of ambiguity).) of Ashurbanipal (r. 669–631 BC). Libbāli-šarrat married Ashurbanipal before he became king, probably in 672 BC, and may have lived beyond her husband's death, as documents from the reign of her probable son, Ashur-etil-ilani (r. 631–627 BC) reference the "mother of the king". Libbāli-šarrat enjoys the distinction of being the only known individual from ancient Assyria who was not a king to be depicted holding court since she is depicted in one of Ashurbanipal's reliefs as hosting him at dinner in the palace garden, surrounded by her own female servants.

== Life ==
=== Wife of the crown prince ===
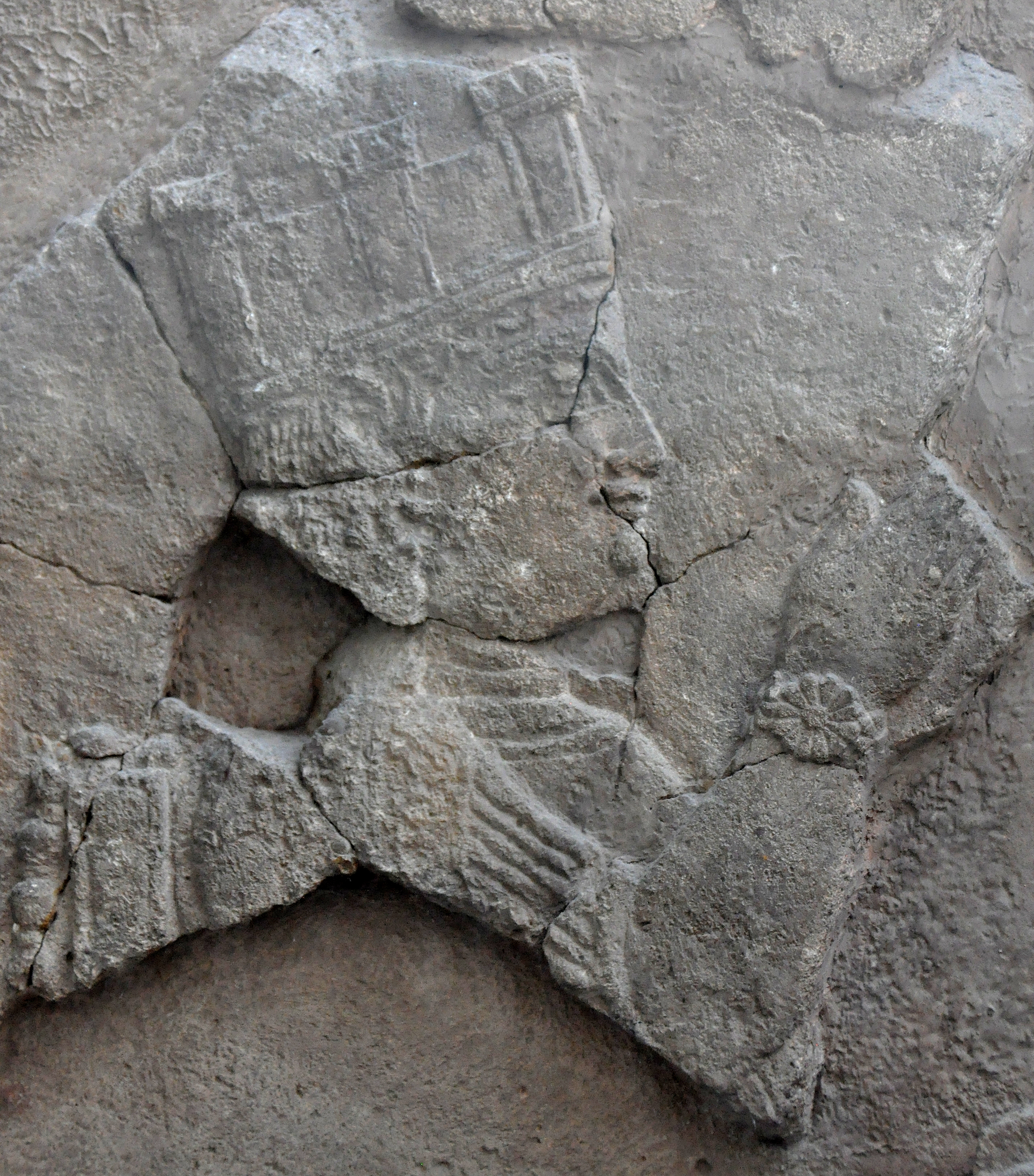
Detail of a stele depicting Libbāli-šarrat

It is not clear when Libbāli-šarrat married Ashurbanipal. The queen of Ashurbanipal's father Esarhaddon (r. 681–669 BC), Ešarra-ḫammat, died in February 672 BC. Contemporary documents recording Ešarra-ḫammat's funeral arrangements record the presence of the queen's daughter and daughter-in-law. Presumably, the daughter was the eldest daughter, Šērūʾa-ēṭirat, and the daughter-in-law might have been Libbāli-šarrat. In that case, Libbāli-šarrat's marriage to Ashurbanipal took place before Ešarra-ḫammat's death, but the daughter-in-law mentioned could also be the wife of another of Ashurbanipal's sons. The Assyriologist Simo Parpola believes that Libbāli-šarrat did not marry Ashurbanipal until around the time he became crown prince, in May 672 BC.

The name Libbāli-šarrat is unique and not known to have been borne by any other individual. Because it also incorporates the element šarratum ("queen") it might not be her birth name, but rather a name she assumed upon her marriage to Ashurbanipal or when he was designated as crown prince and heir by Esarhaddon. Translated literally, Libbāli-šarrat means "the inner city is queen". "The inner city" might be a term for the goddess Ishtar. Alternatively, the name should perhaps be interpreted as "[in] the inner city, [the goddess] is queen". Libbāli was also the name of the ancient temple quarter at Assur, Assyria's religious center.

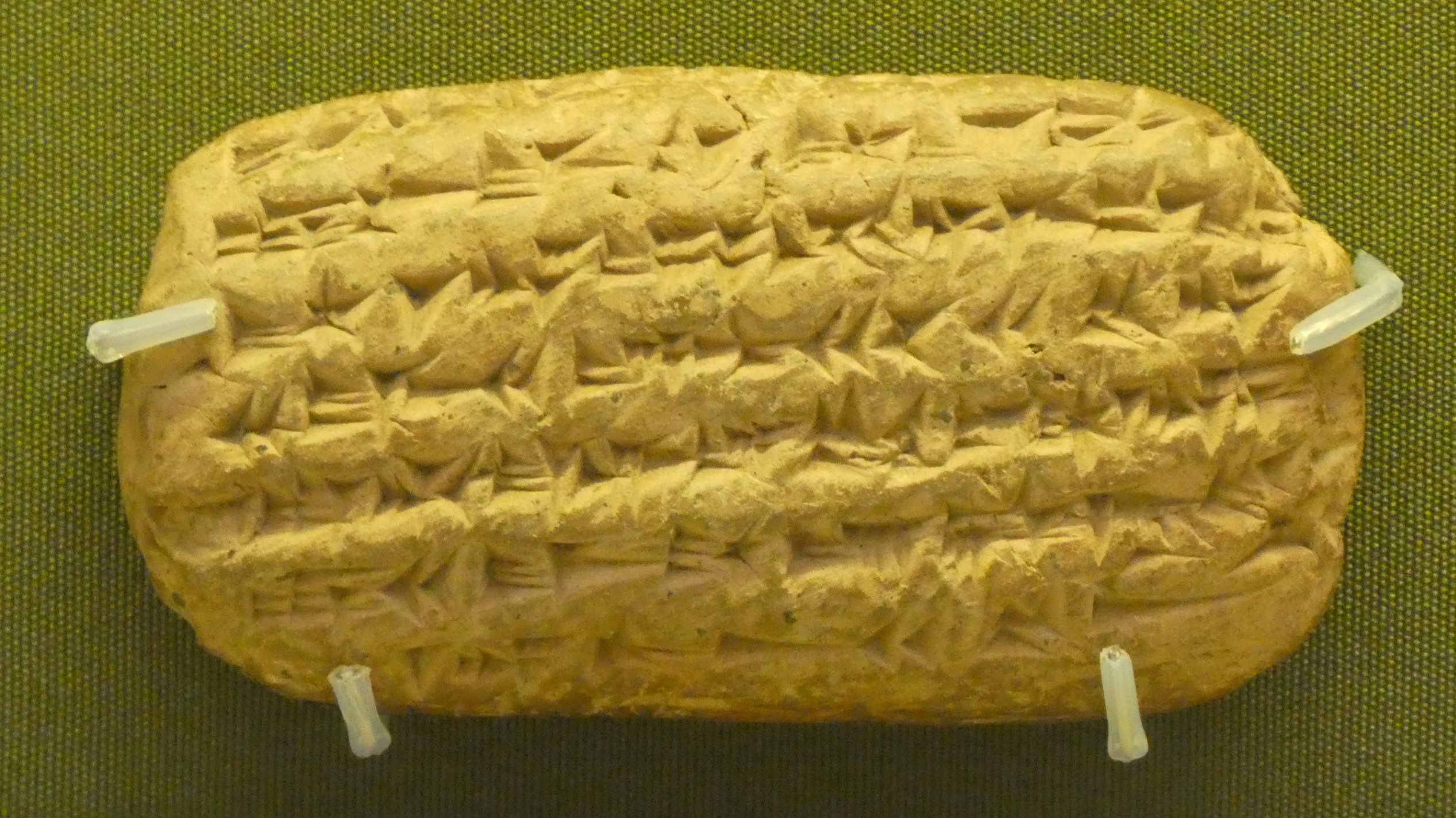
Letter from Šērūʾa-ēṭirat to Libbāli-šarrat

There may have existed some tension between Libbāli-šarrat and Ashurbanipal's sister Šērūʾa-ēṭirat. In c. 670 BC, near the end of Esarhaddon's reign, Šērūʾa-ēṭirat wrote a letter to Libbāli-šarrat in which she reprimanded the future queen for not studying and informed her that while Libbāli-šarrat would one day become queen, Šērūʾa-ēṭirat still outranked her as she was the king's daughter. An alternative reading of the letter is that it was a somewhat brusque attempt at trying to help Libbāli-šarrat adjust to royal life, not an attempt to put her in her place. Šērūʾa-ēṭirat's letter suggested that Libbāli-šarrat may not have been able to read and write at this time, and that shame would be brought on the royal family if she would be unable to do so after becoming queen. Although Libbāli-šarrat, as the wife of a member of the Assyrian royal family, would have long been groomed for her role, the letter illustrates that becoming the wife of the crown prince still required big adjustments at even a quite late stage. As can be inferred from later documents, Libbāli-šarrat did learn to read and write properly and in time began to share the scholarly and literary interests of her husband, who is famous for assembling the Library of Ashurbanipal.

=== Queen of Assyria ===
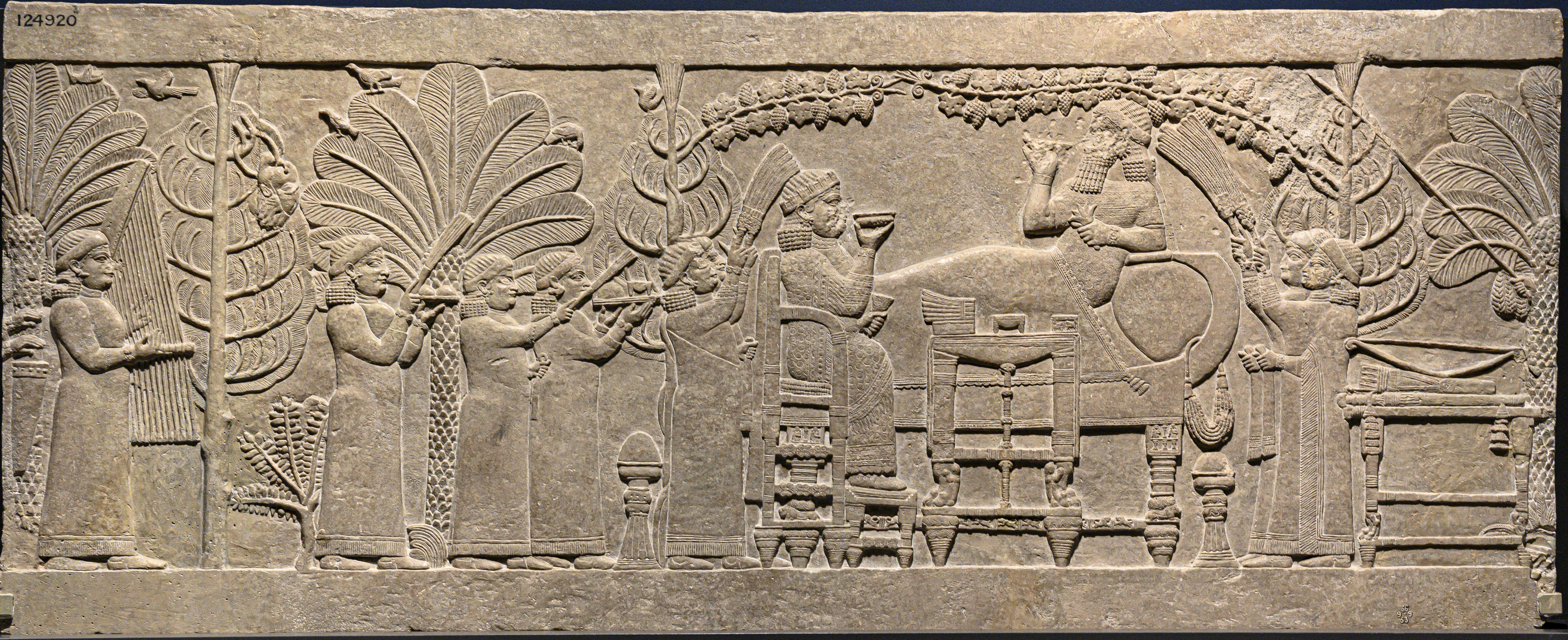
The "Garden Party" relief of Ashurbanipal, depicting the royal couple dining in the center

Beginning under reforms initiated by Sargon II (r. 722–705 BC), the queens of the Sargonid dynasty of Assyrian kings had their own military units sworn directly to them. Among the military staff of Libbāli-šarrat was the chariot driver Marduk-šarru-uṣur, who distinguished himself in the 652–648 civil war against Ashurbanipal's brother Shamash-shum-ukin.

Libbāli-šarrat is famously depicted along with Ashurbanipal in Ashurbanipal's "Garden Party" relief, wherein the two are depicted as dining, surrounded by Libbāli-šarrat's female servants, with Libbāli-šarrat herself sitting opposite her husband in a high-backed chair. Ashurbanipal meanwhile is depicted reclining on a couch. The royal couple are in the relief raising their cups up in celebration over Ashurbanipal's 653 BC victory over Elam, with the head of the Elamite king Teumman hanging from one of the trees. Libbāli-šarrat's high status as consort is illustrate in the relief by how close she is to the king as well as her jewelry and dress. Ashurbanipal is shown to have greater power still, as he is depicted slightly larger and higher up in the image. A striking detail with the "Garden Party" relief, however, is that while Ashurbanipal does not wear his crown, Libbāli-šarrat does. The fact that she is seated while Ashurbanipal is reclining is also significant, since sitting on a throne was a divine and royal privilege. (Note: Perhaps showing Ashurbanipal reclining was a compromise between showing him standing (impossible as it would depict him as subordinate to his sitting wife) and sitting in his own throne (inappropriate since in artwork there usually was only one throne depicted at any one given time).) This means that the entire scene is actually organized around Libbāli-šarrat, rather than Ashurbanipal. The relief is the only known surviving image from ancient Assyria depicting an individual other than the king not only effectively holding court but also hosting the king. (Note: There are actually no known images of Ashurbanipal seated on a throne or holding court, perhaps meaning that the symbol of the throne was losing its status in art, and possible also at court, during his reign.)

In addition to the "Garden Party" relief, another contemporary depiction of Libbāli-šarrat, on a stele, is known. This portrait shows the queen in a formal pose making some form of ritualistic gesture with a plant. Noblewomen in Assyria, including queens, regularly made donations to temples and dedications to the gods as a way to garner divine favor and support. One such dedication written by Libbāli-šarrat is known, which reads:

For the goddess [...], great [Lady], her Lady. [Libbāli-šarrat, consort of Ashurb]anipal, king of the world, king of Assyria, she has made it [...] of red gold [for the life and health of] Ashurbanipal, her beloved, (for) his length of days, the longevity of his throne and for herself, for her life, her length of days, and the well-being of her dynasty. May (the goddess) make her words pleasing to the king, her husband, and may she (the goddess) make them grow old together. (Thus) she has made (it) stand and donated (it).

Libbāli-šarrat was presumably the mother of Ashurbanipal's immediate successors, Aššur-etil-ilāni (r. 669–631 BC) and Sîn-šar-iškun (r. 669–631 BC), given that sons born of Ashurbanipal's lower-ranking wives, such as a son by the name of Ninurta-sharru-usur, appear to not have played any political roles. Libbāli-šarrat might have lived for some time after Ashurbanipal's death in 631 BC, as there is a tablet dating to Ashur-etil-ilani's reign referencing the "mother of the king".
