= Mullissu-mukannishat-Ninua =

Ancient Assyrian queen

- Woman of the Palace (Note: Though usually used by historians today, the title of "queen" as such did not exist in the Neo-Assyrian Empire. The feminine version of the word for king (šarrum) was šarratum, but this was reserved for goddesses and foreign queens who ruled in their own right. Because the consorts of the kings did not rule themselves, they were not regarded as their equals and as such not called šarratum. Instead, the term reserved for the primary consort was MUNUS É.GAL (woman of the palace). In Assyrian, this term was rendered issi ekalli, later abbreviated to sēgallu.)
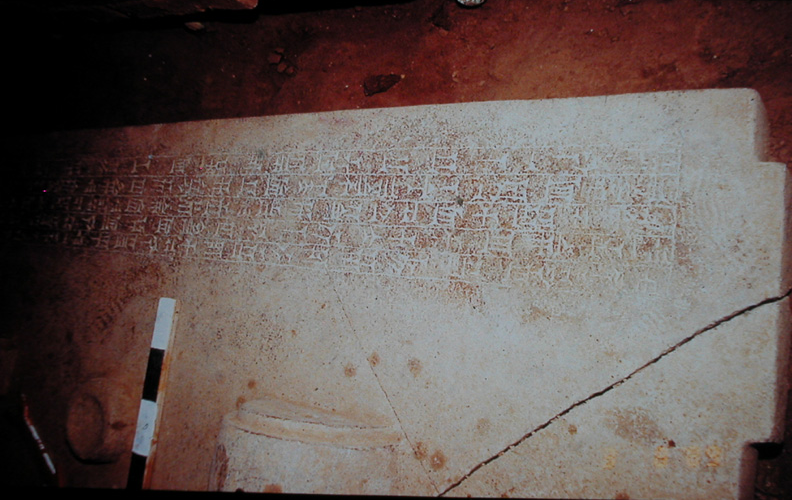
- Inscribed lid of the sarcophagus of Mullissu-mukannishat-Ninua at Nimrud
- Died: After 859 BC
- Spouse: Ashurnasirpal II
- Issue: Shalmaneser III (?)
- Akkadian: Mullissu-mukannišat-Ninua
- Father: Ashur-nirka-da’’inni

Mullissu-mukannishat-Ninua (Akkadian: Mullissu-mukannišat-Nīnua) was a queen of the Neo-Assyrian Empire as the primary consort (Note: Assyrian kings at times had multiple wives at the same time, but not all were recognized as queens (or "women of the palace"). Though it has been disputed in the past, it appears that only one woman bore the title at any given time, as the term typically appears without qualifiers (indicating a lack of ambiguity).) of Ashurnasirpal II (r. 883–859 BC). She was probably also the mother of his son and successor Shalmaneser III (r. 859–824 BC). Mullissu-mukannishat-Ninua is only known from her tomb, discovered in Nimrud in 1989. She was the daughter of the "great cupbearer" Ashur-nirka-da’’inni and as such probably belonged to the Assyrian aristocracy before she became queen.

== Life ==
=== Queen of Ashurnasirpal II ===
Mullissu-mukannishat-Ninua is known only from her tomb and its contents, found in 1989 among the Queens' tombs at Nimrud in the ruins of the Northwest Palace of the ancient Assyrian capital of Nimrud. As a result, little is known of her other than her name. Per the inscription on the lid of her sarcophagus, she was the queen of Ashurnasirpal II (r. 883–859 BC). Mullissu-mukannishat-Ninua was probably the first person to be buried in the tombs in the Northwest Palace, since her sarcophagus is wider than the entrance to the room housing it and must as such have been constructed before the surrounding vault.

Because the queens of the two Neo-Assyrian kings preceding Ashurnasirpal II (Adad-nirari II, 911–891 BC, and Tukulti-Ninurta II, 891–884 BC) are unknown Mullissu-mukannishat-Ninua is the as of yet earliest known queen of the Neo-Assyrian Empire. She is the only Neo-Assyrian queen for which information concerning her family background and origin are known; her funerary inscription identifies her as the daughter of Ashur-nirka-da’’inni, the "great cupbearer" (šāqiu rabiu) of Ashurnasirpal. It is possible that Ashur-nirka-da’’inni is the same person as a man of the same name who was the eponym holder (the person whose name was used as the name of the year) in 860 BC. Michael Roaf suggested in 1995 that Ashur-nirka-da’’inni's appointment as great cupbearer and eponym holder coincided with Mullissu-mukannishat-Ninua's marriage to Ashurnasirpal and that she was thus the king's second wife (after an unknown earlier queen) and married to him only briefly, but this is speculative; it is equally likely that Ashur-nirka-da’’inni held the position of great cupbearer significantly earlier and that him being honored as eponym holder was a late development. Due to their typical Assyrian names and Ashur-nirka-da’’inni's high position it is likely that both Mullissu-mukannishat-Ninua and her father belonged to the Assyrian aristocracy.

=== After Ashurnasirpal II's reign ===
Albert Kirk Grayson suggested in 1993 that Mullissu-mukannishat-Ninua outlived Ashurnasirpal by more than half a century, since the seal of the influential turtanu (commander-in-chief) Shamshi-ilu, active in the late 9th and early 8th centuries BC, was found in her grave and must have been placed there around 800 BC. This idea has been discarded by recent scholars, however, given that the seal was located in a bronze coffin in the same room, not inside Mullissu-mukannishat-Ninua's sarcophagus.

Though Grayson's idea is no longer accepted, it is clear from the inscription on her sarcophagus that Mullissu-mukannishat-Ninua did outlive Ashurnasirpal for some time. The inscription curiously appears to identify her as the queen of both Ashurnasirpal and of his son and successor Shalmaneser III (r. 859–824 BC). What this means is not clear and various explanations have been proposed; if she was young and only married Ashurnasirpal late in his reign she could in principle have then married his son. Alternatively, she might have been allowed to keep the title of queen after her husband's death (i.e. as queen dowager), though there is little to no evidence that other Assyrian queens did so. It is also possible that the inscription merely identifies her by her formal title and should be interpreted as her being the queen of Ashurnasirpal, but dying in the reign of Shalmaneser. Whether Mullissu-mukannishat-Ninua was Shalmaneser's wife or mother continues to be a topic of debate among modern scholars, though it is considered more likely that she was his mother.

The inscription on the lid of Mullissu-mukannishat-Ninua's sarcophagus is mostly made up of a curse against anyone who would disturbe her tomb:

Belonging to Mullissu-mukannishat-Ninua, queen of Ashurnasirpal, king of Assyria, of Shalmaneser, king of Assyria. No one later may place herein (anyone else), be it a palace lady or a queen, nor remove this sarcophagus from its place. Anybody who removes this sarcophagus from its place, his spirit will not receive funerary offerings with (other) spirits: it is a taboo of Shamash and Ereshkigal! Daughter of Ashur-nirka-da’’inni, great cup-bearer of Ashurnasirpal, king of Assyria. Anyone later who removes my throne from before the shades of the dead, may his spirit receive no bread! May someone later clothe (me) with a shroud, anoint (me) with oil and sacrifice a lamb.

Despite the curse, Mullissu-mukannishat-Ninua's sarcophagus was looted at some point after her burial. During the looting, a part of the great stone lid of the sarcophagus was smashed, which over the centuries allowed dust to drift into the grave. When the tomb was found in 1989, all that was found inside the looted sarcophagus was a single stone bead and a single piece of bone.
