= Queens' tombs at Nimrud =

Set of four tombs

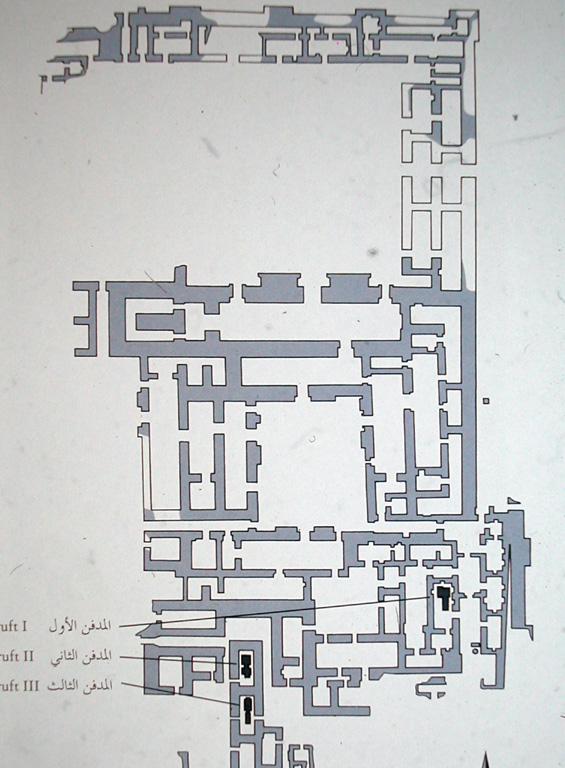
Floor plan of Ashurnasirpal II's palace, with the location of the tombs marked

The Queens' Tombs at Nimrud are a set of four tombs discovered by Muzahim Hussein at the site of what was once the ancient Assyrian city of Nimrud. Once the capital of the Neo-Assyrian Empire, Nimrud (known also by its biblical name Calah and its ancient name Kalhu) was located on the East bank of the Tigris river, in what would be modern day Northern Iraq. Nimrud became the second capital of the Assyrian empire during the ninth century BCE, under Assurnasirpal II. Assurnasirpal II expanded the city and built one of the most significant architectural achievements at Nimrud, the Northwest Palace––bētānu in Assyrian. The palace was the first of many built by Neo-Assyrian rulers, and it became a template for later palaces. During an excavation of the Northwest Palace in 1988, the Queen's Tombs were discovered under the Southern, domestic wing. All four tombs discovered within the palace were built during the ninth and eighth centuries and were primarily constructed of the mudbrick, baked brick, and limestone ––materials commonly used in Mesopotamian architecture. The architecture of the tombs as well as the Northwest Palace within which they are housed provide historical insight into the Assyrian Empire's building techniques. The most notable items found within the queens' tombs included hundreds of pieces of fine jewelry, pottery, clothing, and tablets. These objects crafted by Neo-Assyrian artists would later allow archaeologists to build on their understanding of Neo-Assyrian goldsmithing techniques. Each tomb was built in advance of a queen's death and construction began as early as the 9th century under Assurnasirpal II and continued under Shalmaneser III.

== Discovery and excavations ==
=== Northwest Palace ===
Excavations at Nimrud began in the 1840s, when explorer Austen Henry Layard first uncovered the city's remains. Throughout the 1940s and 50s, British archaeologist Max Mallowan led excavations of the ancient city, sponsored by the British School of Archaeology in Iraq. Through his excavations, Mallowan greatly contributed to mapping the topography of the ancient city. Mallowan's excavations included the southern section of the Northwest Palace where, in 1951, he discovered the so-called “Harem Quarters” underneath room DD. He found an Iron Age, eighth century B.C.E, coffin containing a woman. Mallowan, however, did not search underneath the baked brick pavement flooring of the Southern Section of the Palace.

=== Discovery of The Queens' tombs ===
In the late 1980s the Iraqi Department of Antiquities started excavating the Northwest palace of King Assurnasirpal II at Nimrud and discovered four tombs of Neo-Assyrian royal women. In the same general area Mallowan discovered the burial, Muzahim Mahmoud Hussein and his team noticed parts of the brick floor in the Southern Section were sticking up at odd angles. The flooring was removed, which led to the discovery of Tomb I, the first of a total of four sealed tombs uncovered by Hussein located within and underneath the Northwest Palace. The tombs not only housed the bodies of various royal women of the Neo-Assyrian Empire––identified by inscriptions, stamps, and adornment, but contained priceless artifacts such as jewelry, decorations, and ceramics that provided new insight into Assyrian culture and craftsmanship.

=== Obstacles ===
Since the discovery, there have been continuous obstacles in the discernment, recording and preservation of data and information from the Queens’ Tombs. Some of the difficulties were due to the age of the find. The burials were disturbed and looted in antiquity, so the original dress and arrangement of bodies and objects is lost. For example, in Tomb II, a second queen was laid on top of the first about 20–50 years later, and this displaced the original position of the first queen and her belongings. As well, in Tomb III, the main coffin was found empty except a bone fragment and one bead, but three other coffins with partial skeletons were found in the antechamber. The unusual arrangement of the coffins and the lack of a body or objects in the main burial suggests that the tomb was looted and possibly rearranged in antiquity.

Archaeologists meticulously excavated Tombs I and IV. But due to security issues, they were forced to hastily dig Tombs II and III. For example, information regarding dimensions, findspots, photographs, and detailed descriptions were sometimes left out of the record. Additionally, these objects now reside in an unknown repository in Iraq, so this information cannot be recovered. In addition to the rushed excavation, archeologists also faced budget cuts, lack of supplies, and insufficient funding due to the outbreak of Iran-Iraq war in the 1980s and its subsequent sanctions. These adversities continued with the Gulf Wars.

The difficulties with preserving objects found in the tombs did not end with excavation. Important objects found in the Queen's Tombs were kept in a vault of Baghdad's central bank. Unfortunately, the bank was bombed twice while the objects were in its care. It was bombed first at the start of 1991 and again during the American invasion in 2003. Miraculously, the vault survived both bombings, but the flooding caused by the second bombing irreparably damaged many of the objects. In addition, the more mundane objects from the excavations, which were kept at the Iraq Museum and the Mosul Museum, were looted during the war and the whereabouts of many of these items remain unknown.

From April 10–12, 2003, the State Board of Antiquities and Heritage (SBAH), which is located in the same complex as and administers the Iraq National Museum, was looted. This incident was a grievous destruction of institutional and cultural memory, in addition, to the unimaginable loss of many archeological finds. Looters destroyed equipment and objects before burning records, during an attempt to set the building on fire. In the aftermath of the looting, programs such as the National Endowment for the Humanities (NEH) funded the reconstruction of destroyed information and manuscripts. One of the projects they funded led to the republication of the original manuscript on the Queen's Tombs written by Hussein. The original report had been printed in a discolored and inadequate format due to the lack of access to printing resources caused by the sanctions in 2000. The reprint allowed for the addition of new information, past corrections along with further detail, and drawings.

Modern looting and trafficking continue to pose a serious threat to the preservation and safekeeping of the site and its objects. In 2010, Christie's New York, a prominent private auction house, withdrew a pair of earrings that were for sale when it was discovered that they were a trafficked part of the archeological finds from Nimrud's royal tombs.

=== Reception ===
The discovery of the tombs originally received substantial coverage, including a full-color spread in Time Magazine, but the attention drifted with the Gulf Wars on the horizon. Additionally, the original reports were largely in Arabic and local to Iraq, which limited Western access to them due to an international embargo. Thus, the queens’ tombs have received limited academic attention.

The Nimrud Tombs are “one of the most important archaeological finds of the second half of the twentieth century,” but the chaos of war and the language barrier has resulted in the tombs often being overlooked and underappreciated in the West.

== The tombs ==
=== Overview ===
The Tombs were built under the residential wing of the Northwest palace by Assurnasirpal II and his son Shalmaneser III prior to the queens’ deaths. As of January 2018, the tombs were the only discovered Neo-Assyrian royal burial complete with burial dress and objects of interment, so the find was crucial for understanding Neo-Assyrian royal burial procedures. Similar vaulted tombs and burial sites for both royals and the public were similarly found beneath residences in Ashur, Til Barsip, and other locations in Nimrud. These other sites also displayed the practice of providing the dead with objects and adornment that reflected wealth and status.

The tombs themselves were made primarily of various types of brick, including mud-brick and baked brick. The tombs were vaulted, and the vaults themselves were made out of baked brick. Stone and marble slabs sealed off the tombs.

The discovery of the Queen's Tombs and their excavation gives unique and valuable insight into the burial rituals of the royal Neo-Assyrians as well as Neo-Assyrian domestic life, social structure, physical health, and daily life.

The four tombs were filled with personal items, many of which were made from precious materials and came from foreign regions further to the west. Such foreign objects may have been obtained or brought by the queens as “a part of their bridal wealth.” These far-flung artifacts show the extent of the empire's power and the importance of strategic royal marriages.

The details as to which specific queens were buried where, as well as their names, are somewhat unclear. The limited information on this subject has resulted in many contradictory claims. However, there is some evidence to suggest the names of certain women and the bodies they likely belonged to. Additionally, the site and its inscriptions add dynastic women, previously left out of the historical record.

The women buried in the tombs have been identified to likely be:

- Mullissu-Mu- kannishat-Ninua, wife of Ashurnasirpal II (r. 883–859 BCE), whose tomb is located in Room 57
- Yabaʾ, the wife of Tiglath Pileser III (r. 744–727 BCE)
- Banitu, wife of Shalmaneser V (r. 726–722 BCE)
- Atalya, wife of Sar- gon II, (r. 721–705 BCE)
- Hama, the young wife of Shalmaneser IV (r. 782–773 BCE), whose magnificent gold stamp seal was found in Tomb III

The tombs found at Nimrud are commonly referred to as the “Queens’ Tombs”, but it is likely that these royal Assyrian women were not regarded as queens in the way of its modern definition. The Akkadian word for king is šarru, hence the word for queen would be šarratu. Yet, šarratu was only reserved for goddesses, as the Assyrian queens were not equal co-rulers with their spouses. Royal Assyrian women, typically the wives of kings, were instead referred to as sēgallu, or “woman of the palace.” The Neo-Assyrians queens were not chief consorts, instead they had a domestic role in the court as “rulers of the domestic realm.” This distinction is why they were buried under the floors of the bētānu in their palace and not next to the kings in Assur––they ruled the domestic parts of the palace both while alive and in death. While this role differed from the role of the kings, it was nonetheless incredibly important in the court.

=== Tomb I ===
Mallowan had labeled the rooms in the Northwest Palace with letters, and Tomb I was found by searching underneath the floor of Room MM, as Mallowan had not previously done so. A vault, made of baked brick, was exposed first. Inside the vault was a cuneiform inscription written on the brick wall. The inscription read “palace of ashurnasirpal King of the World, King of the land of Ashur. Son of tukulti-ninurta [II] King of the World, King of the land of ashur. Son of adad-nirari [II] King of the World, King of the land of ashur.” Ashurnasirpal certainly refers to king Ashurnasirpal II, who constructed the palace, and it is possible that these bricks were reused from an earlier construction. This inscription of Ashurnasirpal II implies that buried within could be one of his wives, but it is also possible that these inscriptions were reused from an earlier construction.

The woman within the sarcophagus was in her early 50s at her time of death and was likely of royal heritage, possibly of a lower rank, or a former queen who outlived her spouse and was no longer carrying out the responsibilities of sēgallu at the time of her death. This theory is supported by the riches with which she was buried, which were plentiful, but paled in comparison to some of the other tombs. The sarcophagus was made of terra-cotta and had a ceramic cover. Mud-brick, baked brick, and marble were used to close the entrance to the tomb. Most of the architectural finds were inside the coffin.

=== Tomb II ===
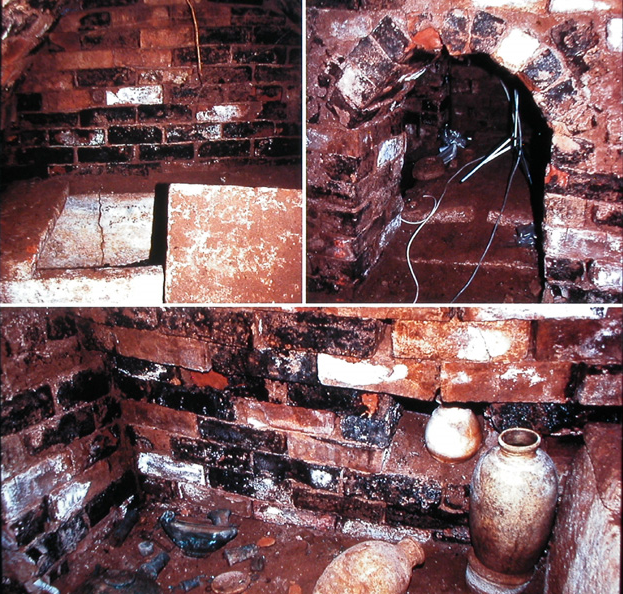
Some photographs of the interior of Tomb II

This excavation began in 1989, and it was when the archeological identification and labeling system was switched from letters to numbers. Hussein found another vaulted chamber, Tomb II, near rooms 44, 49, 51, and 59. This chamber, too, was made of baked brick and stone, while the floor was made of marble slabs, and was closed off by two stone slabs that were likely held together by an iron bar.

A bathtub shaped sarcophagus carved from calcite was found in the Northern end of the burial chamber. It contained the remains of two women, both in their early 30s, laid on top of each other who died approximately a generation apart. The top body was affiliated with objects that identified her as Ataliyā, queen of Sargon. A tablet and two gold bowls seemed to identify the other occupant as "queen of Tiglath-Pileser," but another gold bowl and cosmetics container were inscribed with "Banītu, queen of Shalmaneser." There are several possible explanations for the two names. The inscriptions were written in Akkadian, and Banītu is an Akkadian translation of Yabâ, so they could have been one person. The west Semitic names could also signify foreign birth and, thus, an international marriage, which was popular during the Neo-Assyrian reign, or it could be part of a popular naming trend. The non-Assyrian roots of the queen could explain the many foreign objects found in the tomb as they could be dowry items. It is possible, though, that the objects could have been acquired as gifts and tribute.

=== Tomb III ===
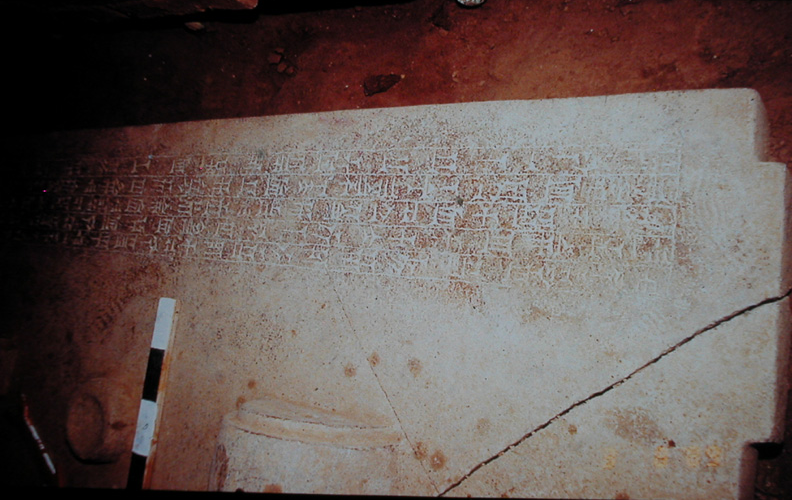
Lid of the sarcophagus in Tomb III

Below the floor of room 57, Hussein and his team found a slab of limestone covering a third vault, also made of baked brick. Bricks in this tomb were also inscribed with not only the mark of Ashurnasirpal II, but also Shalmaneser III, who may have finished construction of the tomb. The Tomb held a sarcophagus in the main chamber made of grey alabaster, but it was empty except for a bone shard and a single bead. An inscription in the lid identified the chamber as belonging to Mullissu-mukanishat-Ninua, queen of Ashurnasirpal and of Shalmaneser. Three other bronze coffins (Coffins 1-3) were found in the antechamber with various partial skeletons of 12 or more people, which were probably secondary to the main burial in the alabaster coffin. These bronze coffins may have been repurposed bathtubs, and could have been used for these burials due to a series of unexpected deaths or an emergency. Coffin 1 held the skeletons of 1 unidentified royal woman, 3 children, one infant, and a fetus; and it held a vast amount of gold and jewelry. A gold seal identified coffin 2 as Hamâ, queen of Shalmaneser. A gold stamp seal pendant that indicated her as such was buried with her and may have initially been placed around her neck. Queen Hama died between the ages of 18 and 20, thus her rule as sēgallu was short-lived. This could explain her burial in one of the bronze coffins rather than a tomb of her own, as her death was likely sudden, leaving no time for a new construction. Hama's body was wearing a gold crown, one of the most famous finds from the excavation of the Queens' Tombs at Nimrud. Coffin 3 held the remains of 5 adults, 2 males, 2 probable female, and 1 probably male.

The unusual placements of the coffins can be explained in various ways, including: someone moving the body in the main coffin to the ones in the antechamber at some period in antiquity, looting, or other extenuating circumstances. The three coffins in the outer chamber were placed against the doors. This placing prevented the thieves, who robbed the main sarcophagus, from doing the same in the antechamber.

=== Tomb IV ===
The corridor between room 72 and room 71 held a baked brick slab, and underneath was the entrance to Tomb IV. The entrance was arched and blocked by bricks. In Tomb IV, archaeologists found a rectangular stone sarcophagus, originally covered by 4 slabs of terracotta. Only a few objects and a couple teeth remained of the unknown deceased. The tomb was robbed in antiquity, and so little remains, but what is still there confirms the burial practices observed in the other tombs.

== Architectural features and assemblage ==
=== Northwest Palace ===
Around 888 B.C.E., Assyrian king Ashurnasirpal II began constructing what is widely considered to be the most significant architectural achievement of his 24 year reign: the Northwest Palace at Nimrud. The building then became the Assyrian empire's main palace, replacing the royal palace at Ashur. While it was mainly used for administrative purposes and general royal protocol, the palace's historical intrigue primarily stems from its Southern Section, wherein located were the domestic wing and the royal harem. The Southern Section of the Northwest Palace was a residential dwelling for Nimrud's royal women, the wives and cohorts of Neo-Assyrian kings. Given this, dedicating the Southern Section as the resting place for such royal women is fitting.

The overall architectural aesthetic of the Northwest Palace is regarded as Gesamtkunstwerken and very artistic in nature. There is vast evidence to suggest that the palaces of Nimrud were decorated with intricate wall reliefs, blue Mosul marble, paintings, glazed-brick, strips of ivory, and bronze. The Northwest Palace contained many state apartments, as well as courtyards, spacious suites, and a throne room. The large rooms thought to be royal suites for the king and/or queens were surrounded by the courtyards, and rooms were linked together by long corridors, so it is likely that these features gave the palace a feeling of openness and spaciousness.

=== Structural techniques ===
The Northwest Palace and the four tombs were made in part with mud-brick, a brickmaking technique popular in Mesopotamian architecture. The most common Near East building material, mud-brick is made of earth, straw, and water, which is blended into a mixture, shaped, and dried in the sun for up to two weeks. This same mixture is used while wet as a bonding agent between the bricks.

Vaulting was a very common architectural technique in ancient Mesopotamia used to build a strong roof over a room, and vaults were used to build all four queens’ tombs in the Northwest Palace. It is commonly believed that vaulting originated in ancient Greece and Rome, but the Egyptians and Mesopotamians were using mud-brick vaults before Europe. The vaults used in the queens’ tombs were likely designed to protect the sarcophagus from water and structural damage.

== Objects of adornment ==
=== Overview ===
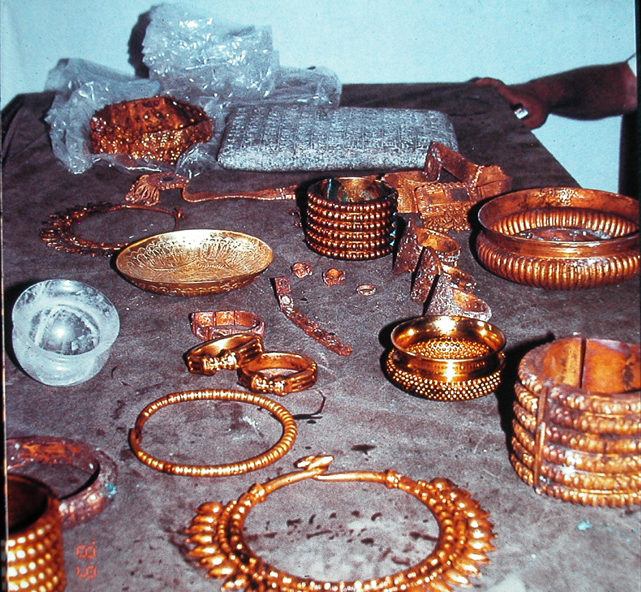
Some of the various treasures discovered in Tomb II

One of the most well-known aspects about the Queen's Tombs excavation was the discovery of jewelry and other objects of adornment. The finds included hundreds of earrings, neck pieces, and vessels. In addition, there were clothes, headdresses, erotic figurines, beads, amulets, mirrors, hair ornaments, pendants, stamps, fibula, seals, bracelets, armlets, anklets, clothing ornaments and more. Many of the objects were gold, however, others were shaped out of silver, copper, bronze, stone, wood, ivory, ceramic, and crystal.

Some of the jewelry and clothing remained in the positions they would have been worn in at the time of burial. Scholars have analyzed the materials, craftsmanship, design, arrangement, and origins of these objects in order to learn more about Neo-Assyrian culture, relations, social structure, and ways of life.

The jewelry finds help scholars understand the dress and burial attire of Neo-Assyrian queens. According to the findings at the Queen's Tombs, queenly burial ensemble, “included a headdress; a pair of earrings; at least one collar, torque, or necklace; beads; one or more pairs of bracelets; sets of up to 10 matching finger rings; a pair of anklets; one or more fibulas; seals with attachment chains; and an ornamented garment.” Each queen was buried with a diadem that had a dorsal streamer, so it is likely this object was a sign of a queenhood and identified each woman as such. The differing sizes of the objects meant they were crafted to fit specific people.

To the Neo-Assyrians, tombs were portals to the afterlife. Thus, while the body lay in the tomb, its spirit would travel through the netherworld and face gatekeepers at seven thresholds before standing before a panel of judges. In the myth of Ishtar's descent, the goddess gives her jewelry and adornment to appease the gatekeepers and judges. Therefore, it is thought that the large amounts of jewelry and other objects of adornment buried with each queen could have been added to pay each queen's tolls and appease the deities of the afterlife. For example, over 300 earrings were found in Tomb II and III. Additionally, these objects of adornment and associated high status would ensure that the deceased individual could retain that same position in the netherworld. As displayed by documentation of grave robbing anxieties, it was believed that when items were removed from tombs, the social status and privilege of the buried individual in the afterlife was lost. This was mirrored in the Myth of Ishtar, for when she was forced to give away her regalia, she lost her power and identity as a queen.

=== Tomb I ===
Tomb one contained a remarkable number of stamps, however, there was no headdress or anklets found in it. This could be evidence of a lower rank, older burial style (9th century BCE), or looting.

Objects: (All item Titles taken directly taken from Hussein's list; see Hussein's list for detailed descriptions and findspots.)

- Seals
- Chain
- Fibula
- Rings and Bracelet
- Earrings
- Beads
- Amulets/Pendants
- Erotic Figurines
- Alabastra and Other Small Bottles

=== Tomb II ===
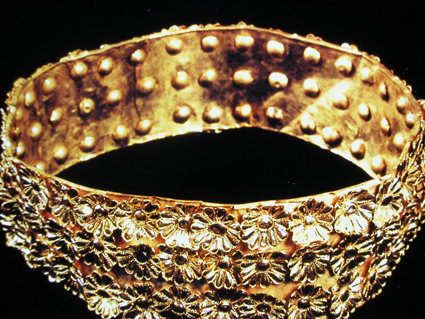
Golden crown from Tomb II

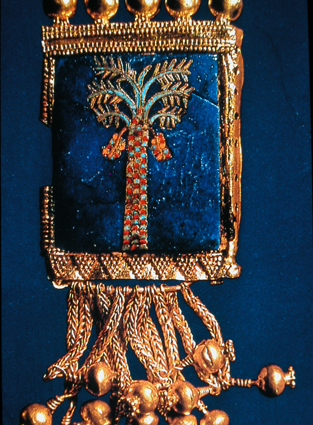
Plaque with palm motif Tomb II

Tomb II was the most intact of the tombs with a wealth of objects and jewelry, and this allows for the most complete information on Neo-Assyrian royal burials.

Objects: (All item Titles taken directly taken from Hussein's list; see Hussein's list for detailed descriptions and findspots.)

- Gold Crown
- Diadem Segments
- Gold Bowls
- Eleven Small Golden Vials
- Rock Crystal Vessels
- Mirrors
- Earrings
- Collars, Torcs, and Necklaces
- Hair Ornaments
- Pendants
- Gold Chains
- Bracelets/Armlets
- Rings
- Anklets
- Clothing Ornaments
- Other Gold Objects
- Silver Objects
- Copper/Bronze Objects
- Stone Objects
- Ivory, Bone and Wood Objects
- Ceramic Items

=== Tomb III ===
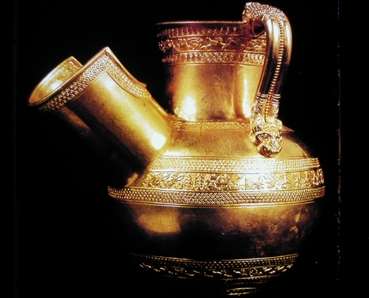
Golden ewer from Tomb III

The main tomb was heavily robbed until only a bone shard and a few beads remained. Coffin 1 contained a large quantity of mostly gold jewelry. The second bronze coffin contained some of the most exceptional and renowned finds of the tombs. The petite female in the tomb wore a large cap-like crown decorated with pomegranates and winged genies. She was identified with a stamp to be queen Hama.

Objects: (All item Titles taken directly taken from Hussein's list; see Hussein's list for detailed descriptions and findspots.)

- Coffin 1
  - Earrings
  - Bracelets/Anklets
  - Rings
  - Miscellaneous Stone Objects
- Coffin 2
  - Gold Vessels
  - Jewellery
  - Earrings
  - Torcs and Necklaces
  - Gold Fibula
  - Bracelets/Armlets and Anklets
  - Rings
  - Clothing Ornaments
  - Objects of Stone, Pottery, and Wood
- Coffin 3
  - Earrings/Rings
  - Pendants and Necklaces/Beads
  - Fibula
  - Bracelet
  - Copper/Bronze Objects
  - Stone Objects
  - Glass/Faience
  - Ivory, Wood, and Shell Objects
  - Pottery

Queen Hama

Because of the gold stamp seal pendant, most likely worn around her neck and the famed crown atop her head, scholars identified Queen Hama, wife of Shalmaneser IV, daughter-in- law of Adad-nirari III as the sole and primary burial in Tomb III, coffin 2. This is furthered by the gold and precious jewelry befitting a queen that was interred with her, and was similar to other royal burials in Tombs I and II. Hama was young at her time of death, thus there may have been little time for preparation, possibly explaining the unusual location of her burial.

The Crown

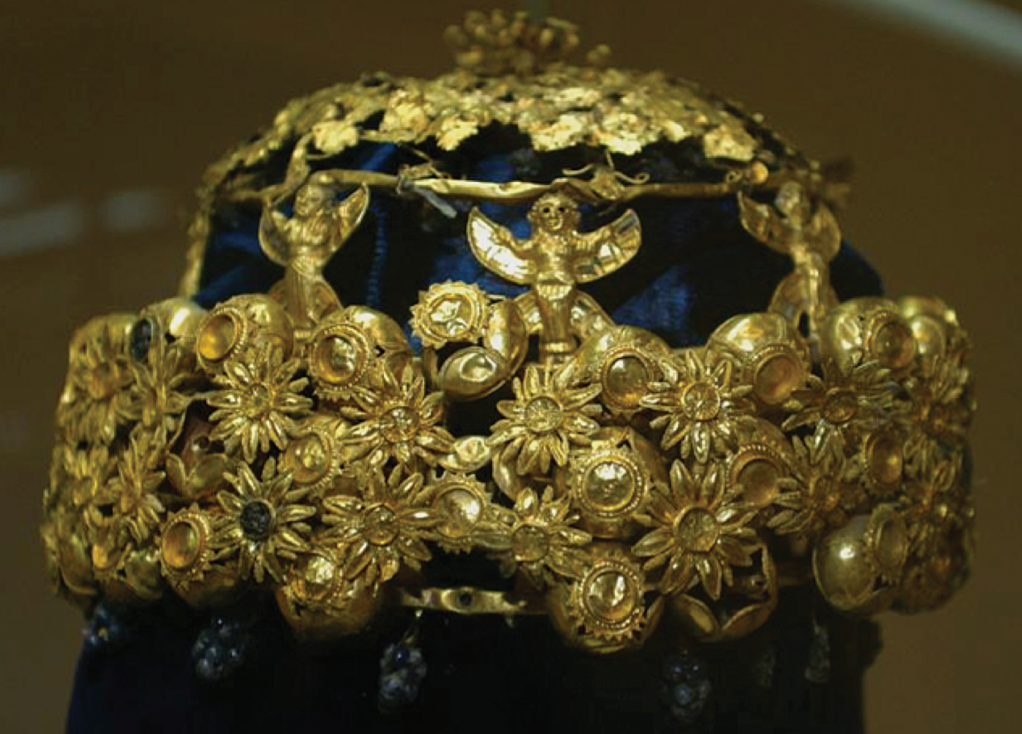
Hama's crown

Hama's crown has become a recognizable symbol of the Queen's Tombs at Nimrud. This gold and lapis lazuli crown's cap-like shape and configuration has no known historical parallels, and it is distinctively different from the queenly dorsal diadems seen in the other tombs, imagery, and on Hama's stamp seal. Its broad diameter, 24 cm, suggest that the crown could have been worn over a diadem with a dorsal streamer or elaborate hairstyle/underpinnings. Because of the iconography on the crown––gold leaves, flowers, grapes, and female winged genies––scholars have placed its origin in western Syria or eastern Cilicia. However, scholars have theorized that the crown's imagery closely resembles the iconography of the dress and adornment of a Neo-Assyrian queen, suggesting the crown originated in Assyria.

Stamp Seal

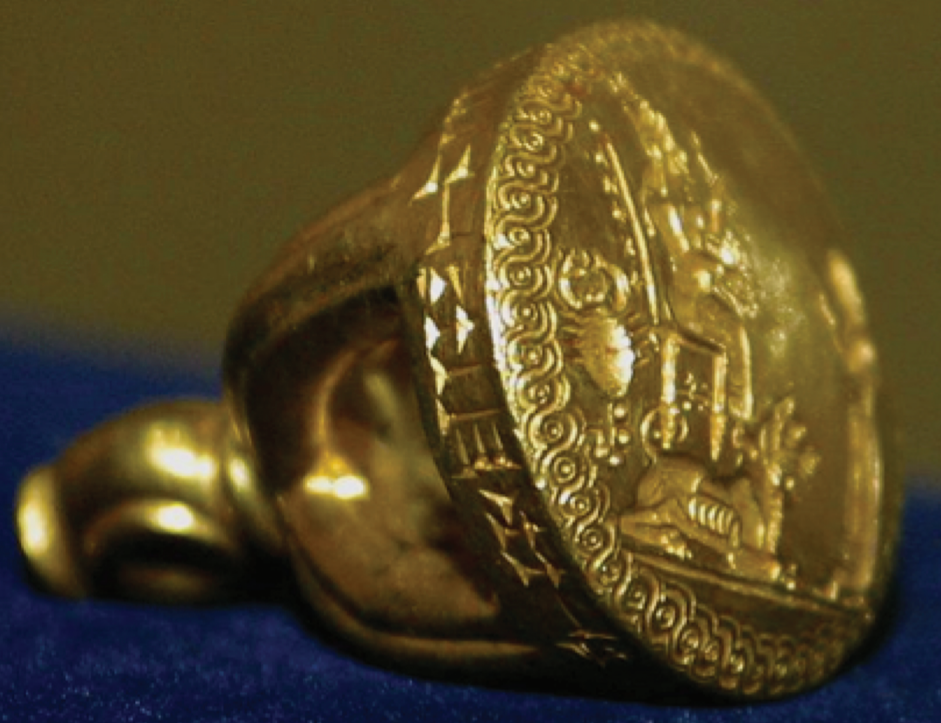
Hama's seal

The stamp seal that identifies Queen Hama with its inscription šá ^{mí}ḫa-ma-a MUNUS.É.GAL šá ^{m}šul-man-maš MAN KUR AŠ kal^{!}-lat {m}U-ÉRIN.DAH, translating to “Belonging to Hama, queen of Shalmaneser, king of Assyria, daughter-in-law of Adad-nerari.” Spurrier describes the stamp seal as “depict[ing] a female worshipper, most likely the queen herself, standing piously before a seated goddess.” The goddess sits on a throne next to an animal and in front of an enlarged scorpion. The animal was originally interpreted as a dog, and then reinterpreted as a lion. This change would reidentify the goddess not as previously believed Gula, but as the prominent Neo-Assyrian goddess who married the god Ashur, Mullissu. Three more stamp seals and two cylinder seals were also found with Queen Hama.

=== Tomb IV ===
Tomb IV was extensively robbed, so only a few objects, dress pieces, and jewelry remained. Because of this, the tomb cannot be used to directly identify Neo-Assyrian burial practices. However, the surviving elements mirrored the other queenly tombs.

Objects: (All item Titles taken directly taken from Hussein's list; see Hussein's list for detailed descriptions and findspots.)

- Silver Bowls
- Stamp Seals
- Jewelry
- Mirror
- Ceramic Items
- Textile

== Destruction of the tombs ==
On April 11, 2015, ISIL released a graphic video of the purposeful demolition of art, sculpture, carvings, and architecture at the ancient historical site of Nimrud using hand tools, power tools, and explosives. Video analyses reveal that the destruction took place over multiple different events. Images show the pile of destroyed Neo-Assyrian relief panels could have existed as early as March 7, 2015. The detonation of the Northwest Palace did not occur until after April 1, 2015. Satellite imagery confirms the destruction and leveling of this ancient palace. UNESCO described the destruction of Nimrud as a “war crime.” The damage and destruction of history is the purposeful erasure of Iraqi cultural heritage. ISIL condemned Nimrud for its pre-Islamic, idolatrous imagery and architecture, and has destroyed other Iraqi and Syrian historical sites.

Since the catastrophic bombing of Nimrud in 2015, the survival of the excavated Queen's Tombs is not confirmed.
