= Ashur-dain-aplu =

Ashur-dain-aplu (Akkadian: 𒀸𒋩𒁕𒅔𒌉𒍑, Aššur-daʾʾin-aplu, meaning "Ashur is the heir's judge") was an ancient Assyrian prince of the Adaside dynasty and palace official with the title ša pān ekalli. He is explicitly identified in a letter as the "son of Shalmaneser", a name only used by Assyrian kings. Though a precise date of the documents that mention him has not been established, the Shalmaneser referenced is either Shalmaneser III (r. 859–824 BC) or, more probably, Shalmaneser V (r. 727–722 BC). If he was the son of Shalmaneser V, Ashur-dain-aplu survived the political turmoil in the aftermath of the deposition and death of his father and the rise of his successor, Sargon II (r. 722–705 BC), to the throne, and continued to retain a prominent political position thereafter, possibly as late as the reign of Esarhaddon (r. 681–669 BC).

== Sources and history ==
Ashur-dain-aplu is identified in a currently undated letter found at Nineveh, now designated as SAA 16, no. 99, l. 9′, written to an unspecified Assyrian king. The letter deals with the restoration of ordinance in the palace and mentions Kabtî, servant and scribe to "Ashur-dain-aplu, son of Shalmaneser". The name Shalmaneser was a regnal name, only ever used by Assyrian kings, and the Shalmaneser who was Ashur-dain-aplu's father is either Shalmaneser III (r. 859–824 BC) or Shalmaneser V (r. 727–722 BC). Another preserved letter, SAA 16, no. 98, is also attributed to Kabtî, who describes himself as "the scribe whom the king, my lord, installed in the house of the ša pān ekalli'". The title ša pān ekalli literally translates to "the one who is in the front of the palace", taken as meaning some sort of palace overseer involved in the administration of the royal palace. Kabtî's letter discusses the dissolution of the palace ordinance, possibly the same incident which is mentioned as having been resolved in the other letter. Since the Kabtî mentioned in both letters is probably the same person, it can be inferred that the ša pān ekalli referenced was Ashur-dain-aplu.

It is not known which king these letters were sent to. The Assyriologists Mikko Luukko and Greta Van Buylaere suggested in 2002 that the king in question was probably either Esarhaddon (r. 681–669 BC) or Shamshi-Adad V (r. 824–811 BC). Although Shalmaneser III, Shamshi-Adad V's father and immediate predecessor, did have a son, Ashur-danin-pal (rendered as Ashur-dain-aplu in Akkadian), it is unlikely that they are the same person. Ashur-danin-pal rebelled against Shalmaneser III and continued to war against Shamshi-Adad V, which fits poorly with the letters since Kabtî, Ashur-dain-aplu's servant, clearly is in support of the king. Official correspondence of this kind is also more rare in the time of Shamshi-Adad V and Shalmaneser III, compared to in the time of Esarhaddon and his immediate predecessors. Nineveh, where both letters were found, was not made the Assyrian capital until the reign of Sennacherib (r. 705–681 BC), Esarhaddon's father and immediate predecessor.

Shalmaneser V was overthrown by Sargon II (r. 722–705 BC), who then usurped the throne. As Shalmaneser V's son, Ashur-dain-aplu through some means survived the turmoil and chaos at the end of his father's reign and even managed to continue his political career, holding the position of ša pān ekalli possibly as late as during the reign of Esarhaddon, Sargon II's grandson.
