= Shalmaneser V =

King of the Neo-Assyrian Empire, 727–722 BC

- King of Assyria; King of Babylon; King of Sumer and Akkad; King of the Four Corners of the World; King of the Universe
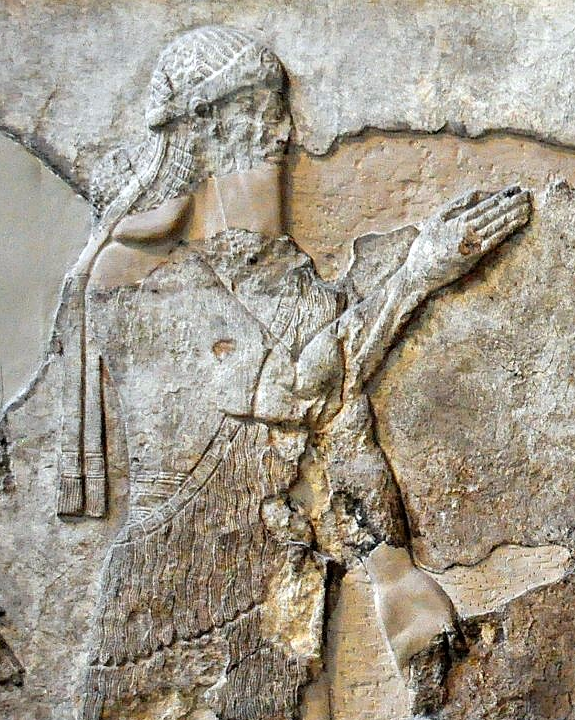
- Possible depiction of Shalmaneser V during his time as crown prince, from one of the reliefs of his father Tiglath-Pileser III

King of the Neo-Assyrian Empire
- Reign: 727–722 BC
- Predecessor: Tiglath-Pileser III
- Successor: Sargon II
- Died: 722 BC
- Spouse: Banitu
- Issue: Ashur-dain-aplu (?); Other children (?)
- Akkadian: Salmānu-ašarēd
- Dynasty: Adaside dynasty
- Father: Tiglath-Pileser III
- Mother: Iaba (?)

Shalmaneser V (Neo-Assyrian cuneiform: Salmānu-ašarēd, meaning "Salmānu is foremost"; Biblical Hebrew: שַׁלְמַנְאֶסֶר Šalmanʾeser) was the king of the Neo-Assyrian Empire from 727 BC to his deposition and death in 722 BC. Though Shalmaneser V's brief reign is poorly known from contemporary sources, he remains known for the conquest of Samaria and the fall of the Kingdom of Israel, though the conclusion of that campaign is sometimes attributed to his successor, Sargon II, instead.

Shalmaneser V is known to have campaigned extensively in the lands west of the Assyrian heartland, warring not only against the Israelites, but also against the Phoenician city-states and against kingdoms in Anatolia. Though he successfully annexed some lands to the Assyrian Empire, his campaigns resulted in long and drawn-out sieges lasting several years, some being unresolved at the end of his reign. The circumstances of his deposition and death are not clear, though they were likely violent, and it is unlikely that Sargon II was his legitimate heir. It is possible that Sargon II was entirely unrelated, which would make Shalmaneser V the final king of the Adaside dynasty, which had ruled Assyria for almost a thousand years.

Shalmaneser V is also known under the name Ululayu ( Ulūlāyu, meaning "one who [was born] in the month Ulūlu"), possibly his birth name, which is used instead of his regnal name Shalmaneser in some non-contemporary sources. Contemporary official documents from his reign exclusively refer to the king as Shalmaneser, not Ululayu, meaning that it is unlikely that the latter was ever used as an official regnal name.

== Background ==
=== Name ===
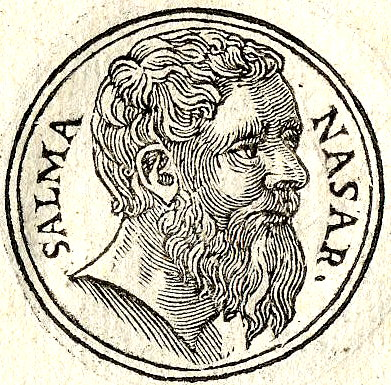
Shalmaneser V from Promptuarium Iconum Insigniorum (Guillaume Rouillé, 1553)

The name Shalmaneser, rendered by contemporaries as Salmānu-ašarēd in Assyria and Šulmānu-ašarēd in Babylonia, was only ever borne by Assyrian monarchs and never given to anyone other than a king. This suggests that it was exclusively a regnal name, assumed by Shalmaneser V, and by the four previous Assyrian kings to use the name, probably upon their accession to the position of crown prince and then more publicly after they rose to the throne itself. The name means "Salmānu is foremost", Salmānu (literally "friendly one") being a deity popular in the Middle Assyrian period and exclusively worshipped within Assyrian territory, possibly being a friendly manifestation of the Assyrian national deity Ashur. Other interpretations of the meaning of Salmānu-ašarēd also exist, it could alternatively mean "likeness of Anu" or possibly "worshipper of fire". Shalmaneser V is unlikely to have taken the regnal name due to its actual etymological meaning, but rather due to its associations with his glorious ancestors and distant predecessors Shalmaneser I (r. 1274–1245 BC) and Shalmaneser III (r. 859–824 BC), well-known for their conquests in the lands west of the Assyrian heartland.

The modern English-language rendition of the name, 'Shalmaneser', comes from how the name appears in Hebrew in the Bible, שלמנאסר (šlmnʾsr). The Hebrew rendition has its own meaning, not the same one as the original Assyrian version: 'Shalmaneser' is derived from the Hebrew words shalem (to be whole, to make complete) and 'asar (to bind, to tie up), effectively meaning something akin to "peace in chains" or "covenant of recompense".

Shalmaneser V is also known by the name Ululayu, meaning "one who (was born) in the month Ulūlu". Several non-contemporary sources, such as the Ptolemaic Canon, the Babylonian King List and the works of later Greco-Roman historians, use this name, or a variation thereof (such as the Greek Eloulaios) in place of his actual regnal name. This has historically been interpreted as Ululayu having been a second regnal name of Shalmaneser, but while the name also appears in a handful of contemporary sources, letters sent by Shalmaneser when he was the crown prince to his father Tiglath-Pileser, these are not formal documents. There is no evidence that contemporary official documents ever referred to him as Ululayu. There is also no evidence that any other Assyrian king ever used more than one regnal name in their lifetime. Nevertheless, Shalmaneser V was evidently remembered by later generations as Ululayu, which, going by the context in which it was used, might have been his birth name.

Some sources anglicise the name Shalmaneser as Salmanasser.

=== Shalmaneser as crown prince ===
Shalmaneser V was the son and heir of Tiglath-Pileser III (r. 745–727 BC). Several letters sent by Shalmaneser to his father while Shalmaneser was still the crown prince (using the name Ululayu) are known, all beginning with the standard formula "To the king, my lord: your servant Ululayu. The best of health to the king, my lord! Assyria is well, the temples are well, all the king’s forts are well. The king, my lord, can be glad indeed". This introduction served as a routine report, telling the king that all was well in the crown prince's lands. Further contents of the letters record several activities conducted by Shalmaneser while he was crown prince, such as detaining emissaries who had passed through certain cities without his permission, and the transportation of goods. Most of his responsibilities appear to have been diplomatic in nature or related to the palace household.

Though it is clear from the letters that Shalmaneser controlled lands on behalf of his father while he was crown prince, it is not entirely clear where he was located. Though his letter on detaining the emissaries specifies that the emissaries had passed through the region of Til-Barsip and Guzana (in modern Syria), it also states that they had been detained at the more eastern site of Kubaneše, meaning that Shalmaneser may have been located close to the Assyrian heartland, rather than in the western provinces. That his letters mention that "Assyria is well" could indicate that his area of responsibility was in central Assyria. The Assyriologists Keiko Yamada and Shigeo Yamada suggested in 2017 that Shalmaneser's letters were sent at a time when Tiglath-Pileser was away on campaign and the crown prince was residing at Nimrud as regent. Yamada and Yamada noted that this was speculative and that Shalmaneser, as crown prince, is also likely to have participated in his father's campaigns.

It is possible that one of Tiglath-Pileser's inscriptions records the crown prince by the name Shalmaneser (not Ululayu), possibly indicating that he had assumed that name already during his father's reign, but the text is fragmentary and it could also be a reference to the city of Til-Barsip (called Kar-Shalmaneser by the Assyrians).

== Reign ==
=== Sources, artifacts, and activities ===
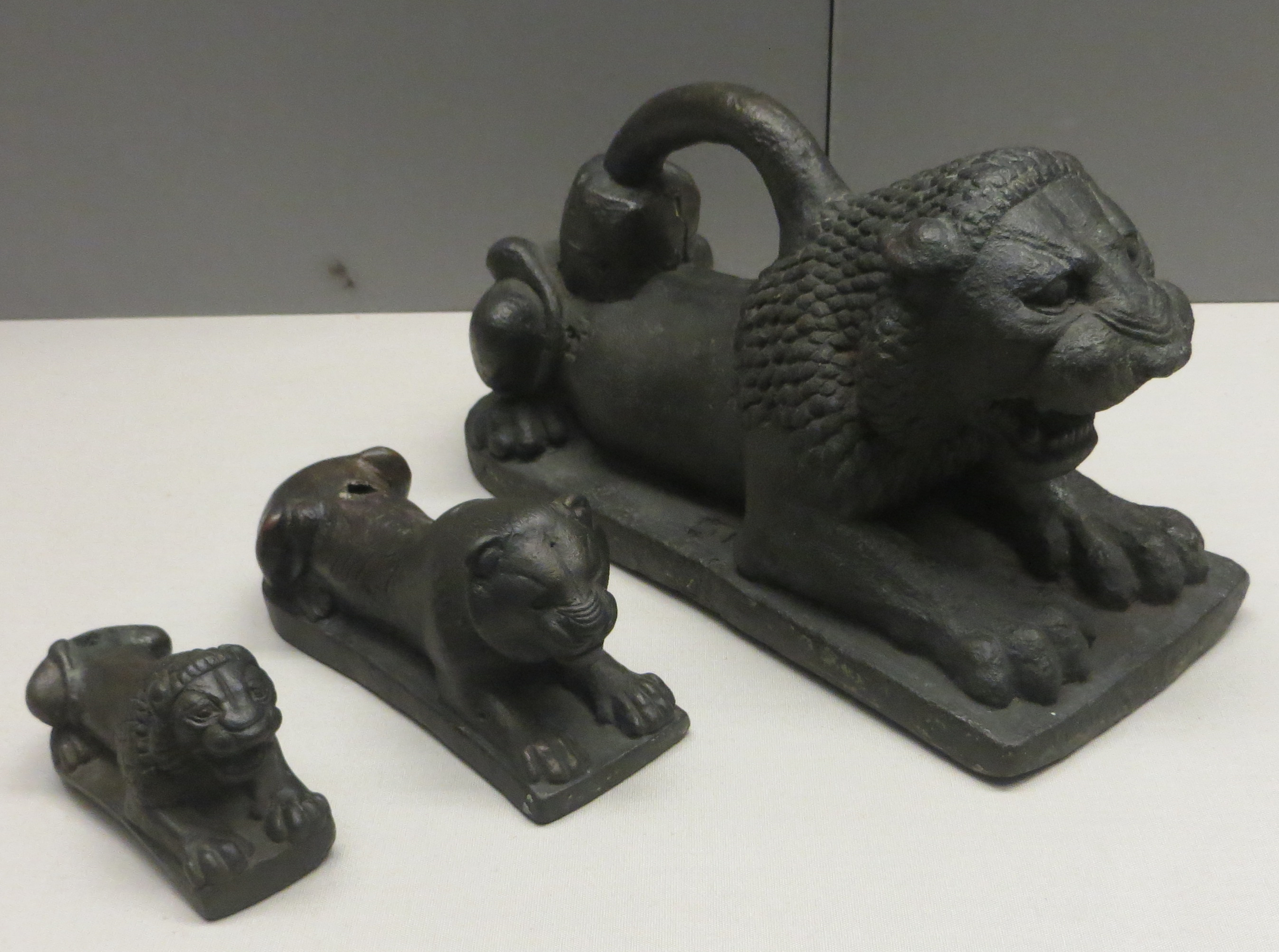
Assyrian lion weights on display in the British Museum

Shalmaneser appears to have become king of both Assyria and Babylonia upon his father's death without challenges. Few contemporary sources have survived from Shalmaneser's brief reign, which makes many of his activities as king poorly known and obscure.

With the exception of a handful of inscriptions on lion-shaped weights, there are no known commemorative inscriptions confidently attributable to Shalmaneser. There is an unpublished and fragmentary brick from the city of Apqu (in modern Syria) that might be referrable to Shalmaneser, indicating some building work in that city. Shalmaneser does not appear to have conducted any large construction projects in the great cities of the Assyrian heartland, such as Assur or Nimrud, and it is plausible that he spent most of his short reign waging war.

Babylonian chronicles state that Shalmaneser became king on the 25th day of the month Tebeth, following Tiglath-Pileser's death, and that he died in the month of Tebeth in his fifth year as king, with his successor Sargon II becoming king on the 12th day of that month. The Babylonian King List records him by the name Ululayu, confirms him as reigning in Babylonia for five years, and designates him as part of the "dynasty of Baltil" (Baltil being a reference to the oldest part of the city of Assur, essentially meaning that Shalmaneser was part of the "Assyrian dynasty"). There is only a single preserved contemporary source for Shalmaneser's reign in Babylonia, a legal document concerning a disputed sale of a slave, dated to his third regnal year.

Shalmaneser's coronation month, Tebeth, was very late in the year, corresponding to December–January, meaning that it is unlikely that he undertook any significant activities in 727 BC. Very little information is provided by any of the surviving sources for events of his reign. The Assyrian Eponym Chronicle, which records significant events for each year in Assyria, is fragmentary in the period covered by Shalmaneser's reign. It is plausible that the fragmentary entry for Shalmaneser's first full year, 726 BC, states that he stayed in the Assyrian capital that year, and the preposition ana (meaning "to"), preserved three times in the Chronicle for the subsequent years, suggests that he was away on military campaigns in 725, 724 and 723 BC. No information survives from 722 BC, his last year.

The lion-shaped weights preserved with inscriptions by Shalmaneser also contain the phrase "mina of the land" (a mina being an ancient Near Eastern unit of weight), possibly meaning "mina of the land (of Assyria)", which would suggest an attempt at establishing a unified national standard of weights.

Traditionally, Assyrian kings held the office of eponym (year name) in their second regnal year, a custom that had occurred regularly up to and including Tiglath-Pileser III's reign. Shalmaneser deviated from this custom, holding the office in his fourth regnal year. The kings of the Sargonid dynasty that succeeded Shalmaneser also took the office of eponym at different points in their reigns, or not at all, which implies that Shalmaneser issued some administrative reforms that were continued and respected by succeeding kings.

=== Rule in Babylonia ===
It seems that Shalmaneser was relatively unopposed as king in Babylonia, though he appears to have faced some resistance from the Chaldean tribes in the south. A 7th century BC letter written in Aramaic records deportations of captives from Bit-Amukani by Tiglath-Pileser, from Bit-Dakkuri by Shalmaneser, from Dur-Sin by Sargon, and from kšw (reading uncertain) by Sargon's successor, Sennacherib. In 1925, the Assyriologist Daniel David Luckenbill identified a fragmentary Babylonian inscription as belonging to Shalmaneser V, by identifying the last sign in the king's name in the inscription as representing ašarēd, the last portion of Shalmaneser's name (Shalmaneser V was the only king of that name to rule Babylonia). The inscription mentions restoration work in the city of Borsippa and the conclusion of some campaign directed at rebels or enemies in the south, but it is too damaged to reveal who these enemies were. The fragmentary account in this inscription reads:

[...] who did not bow in submission at his feet [...] the mention of his name [...] his word(?) [...] bringing [...] hastily before him [...] those not obedient to my(?) command [...] that [...] he caused to be surrounded, surrounding the town. [...] the god in whom he trusted [...] with the help of his sepulchre(?) they destroyed, his rule [...] they did not draw my(?) yoke. [...] who carried off [...] and was turning (them, it) to himself (his own use) [...] his word and the mention of his name they did not fear, and they did not dread his rule [...] overflowed his land(?) and laid it low like a deluge. [...] his own [...] fell upon him and his life was no more. [...] I(?) carried off and brought to Assyria.

=== Conquest of Samaria and western wars ===
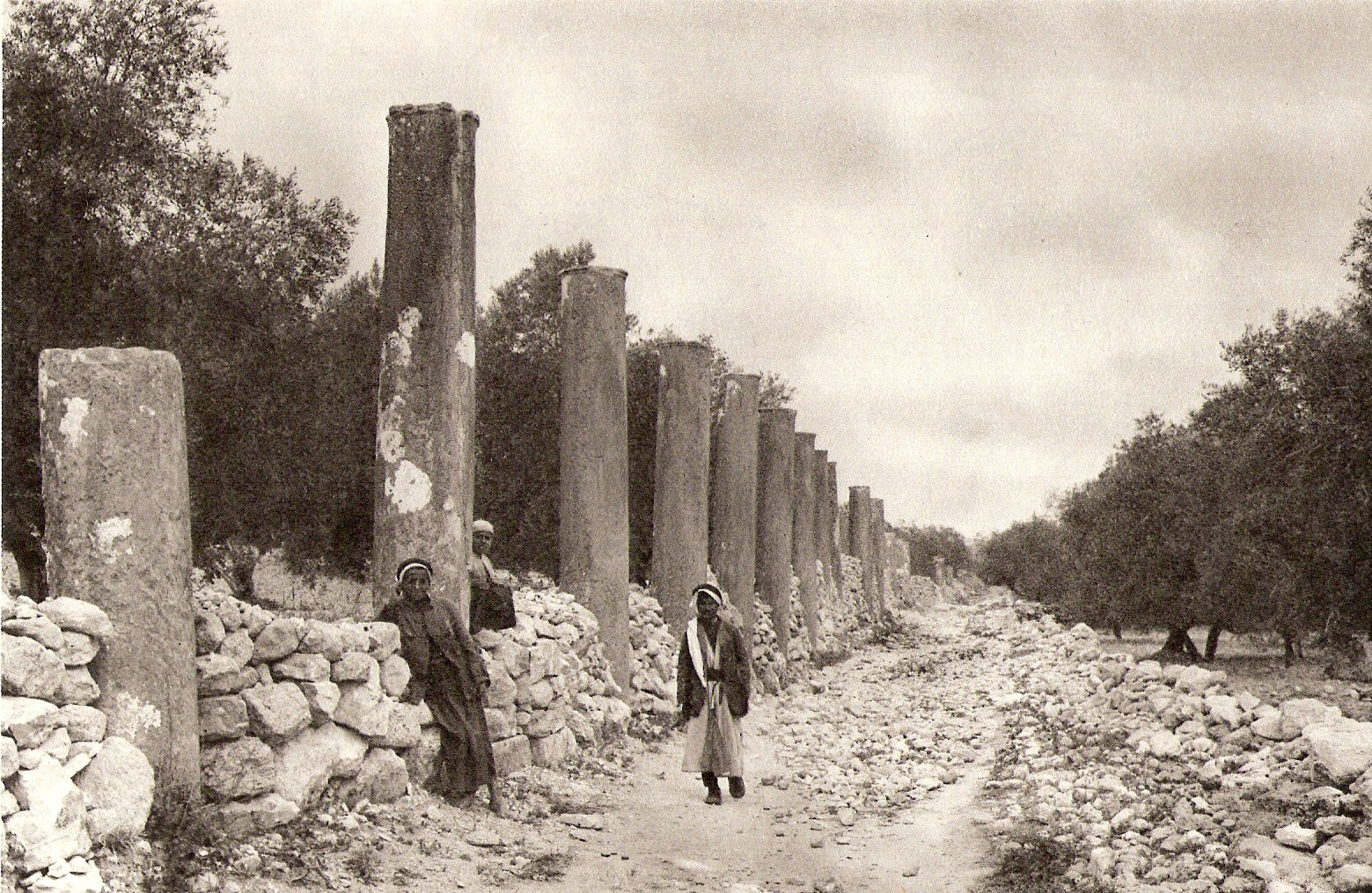
The modern ruins of Samaria (photographed in 1925)

The city of Samaria, capital of the Kingdom of Israel, was besieged and captured by the Assyrians in the 720s BC. The city's fall ended the Kingdom of Israel, which became the Assyrian province of Samerina. On the aftermath of the conquest, nearly thirty thousand people were deported and resettled across the Assyrian Empire, as per the standard Assyrian way of dealing with defeated enemy peoples through resettlement. This specific resettlement is the basis of the narrative of the Ten Lost Tribes. There exists some debate as to whether the Assyrian king who captured Samaria was Shalmaneser V or Sargon II. Both the Babylonian Chronicle and the Bible (2 Kings 17:3–6 and 18:9–11) clearly ascribe the city's conquest to Shalmaneser (the Bible records a siege lasting three years), but Sargon claims in several of his inscriptions that he was the one who conquered it. Various explanations have been proposed for the contradiction.

Map of the Neo-Assyrian Empire at the time of Shalmaneser V and the deportation of the Jews under the rule of Tiglath-Pileser III, Shalmaneser V, and Sargon II

The popular history author Susan Wise Bauer wrote in 2007 that Sargon might have finished the siege, which had been slow, inefficient and still ongoing at the time of Shalmaneser's death. Keiko Yamada and Shigeo Yamada wrote in 2017 that the explicit attribution of the city's capture to Shalmaneser by both the Babylonians and the Bible means that it is likely that the event took place in his reign. Their reconstruction of events place the beginning of the siege in 725 or 724 BC, and its resolution in 722 BC near the end of Shalmaneser's reign, and believe that Sargon's inscriptions relating to Samaria may be referencing another incident in which Sargon was forced to put down a large revolt in Syria, which involved the population of Samaria. If this hypothesis of two conquests is accepted, it is unclear which king was responsible for most of the resettlements, though it is clear from surviving inscriptions that Sargon took responsibility for it. The siege of Samaria was perceived by contemporaries as the most important event of Shalmaneser's time, as indicated by it being the only event mentioned of his reign in the Babylonian Chronicle, possibly partly because of its distance from Assyria.

In addition to his war against the Israelites, Shalmaneser is known to have undertaken other campaigns in the west. The 1st century AD Romano-Jewish historian Josephus records a campaign by the Assyrian king Eloulaios against the coastal cities of Phoenicia. The 2nd century BC Greek historian Menander of Ephesus records a five-year siege of Tyre as part of an Assyrian war in Phoenicia, probably taking place during Shalmaneser's reign. If the siege lasted for five years, it must have been unresolved by the time of Shalmaneser's death, with Sargon II possibly abandoning the hostile policy against the city after becoming king. Shalmaneser is also known to have warred against the kingdom of Tabal in Anatolia, as Sargon mentions in his inscriptions that his "predecessor" defeated and deported the Tabalian king Hullî to Assyria. It is plausible that Shalmaneser annexed certain territories between Tabal and the Assyrian heartland as part of his western wars. The lands of Samʾal (in northern Syria) and Que (in Cilicia) are recorded as tributary states in Tiglath-Pileser's reign but as integrated Assyrian provinces in Sargon's reign.

=== Deposition and death ===
Shalmaneser was deposed in 722 BC and replaced as king by Sargon II. The exact circumstances surrounding the struggle for the throne are not clear, but were likely violent. An awkward succession is clearly indicated by the fact that out of all of Sargon's numerous preserved inscriptions, only a single one mentions Shalmaneser's fate in any detail, recording him as a godless tyrant who robbed Assur, Assyria's ceremonial center, of its traditional rights and privileges:

Shalmaneser, who did not fear the king of the world, whose hands have brought sacrilege in this city [Assur], put on his people, he imposed the compulsory work and a heavy corvée, paid them like a working class. The Illil of the gods, (Note: "Illil of the gods" is one of the names of the god Assur, as can be seen in other inscriptions, such as Ashurbanipal's hymn to Assur.) in the wrath of his heart, overthrew his rule and appointed me, Sargon, as king of Assyria. He raised my head; let me take hold of the scepter, the throne and the tiara.

This inscription serves more to explain Sargon's rise to the throne than to explain Shalmaneser's downfall. As attested in other inscriptions, Sargon did not see the injustices described as actually having been imposed by Shalmaneser V. Other inscriptions by Sargon state that the tax exemptions of important cities like Assur and Harran had been revoked "in ancient times" and the compulsory work described would have been conducted in the reign of Tiglath-Pileser, not Shalmaneser.

Unless Shalmaneser somehow fled Assyria and took refuge in one of the surrounding enemy states (which there is no evidence for), it can be assumed that he was killed upon his deposition. The exact nature of his demise can not be determined. The entry for 722 BC in the Eponym Chronicle is too fragmentary to read, and the Babylonian Chronicle only describes Shalmaneser's end as "the fate", an expression that refers to death, but not through any specific (i.e. natural/violent etc.) means. It seems clear from surviving sources that Sargon's rise to throne was opposed by a significant faction of Assyrians who supported either Shalmaneser or his rightful heir-apparent. This is based on Sargon's inscriptions recording the king in his early reign as dealing with over six thousand "guilty Assyrians" through resettlement. Sargon's rule was also challenged in Babylonia, where the Chaldean chief Marduk-apla-iddina II seized the throne.

In later Assyrian king lists, Sargon was designated as the son of Tiglath-Pileser (and thus Shalmaneser's brother), but that claim does not appear in Sargon's own inscriptions, where he is instead described as being called upon and personally appointed as king by Ashur. The idea that he was Tiglath-Pileser's son is accepted by many modern historians, though treated with considerable caution, but he is not believed to have been the legitimate heir and next-in-line after Shalmaneser. Some Assyriologists, such as J. A. Brinkman, believe that Sargon, at the very least, did not belong to the direct dynastic lineage. References as late as the 670s BC, during the reign of Sargon II's grandson Esarhaddon, to the possibility that "descendants of former royalty" might try to seize the throne suggests that the Sargonid dynasty founded by Sargon was not necessarily well connected to previous Assyrian monarchs. Babylonian king lists dynastically separate Sargon and his descendants from Tiglath-Pileser and Shalmaneser V: Tiglath-Pileser and Shalmaneser are recorded as of the "dynasty of Baltil", whereas the Sargonids are recorded as of the "dynasty of Ḫanigalbat", possibly connecting them to an ancient Middle Assyrian junior branch of the Assyrian royal family who governed as viceroys in the western parts of the Assyrian Empire with the title "king of Hanigalbat". If Sargon was unrelated to Shalmaneser and a completely non-dynastic usurper, the deposition and death of Shalmaneser marked the end of the Adaside dynasty, which had ruled Assyria for nearly a thousand years, since the accession of Bel-bani in the 17th century BC.

== Family and children ==
Neo-Assyrian family tree

Key (male • female • KING)

- ADAD-NIRARI II (r. 911-891 BC)
  - TUKULTI-NINURTA II (r. 890-884 BC)
    - ASHURNASIRPAL II (r. 883-859 BC), m. Mullissu-mukannishat-Ninua
      - SHALMANESER III (r. 859-824 BC)
        - Ashur-danin-pal
        - SHAMSHI-ADAD V (r. 824-811 BC), m. Shammuramat
          - ADAD-NIRARI III (r.811-783 BC)
            - SHALMANESER IV (r. 783-773 BC), m. Hama
            - ASHUR-DAN III (r. 773-755 BC)
            - ASHUR-NIRARI V (r. 755-745 BC)
              - TIGLATH-PILESER III (r. 745-727 BC), m. Yaba
                - SHALMANESER V (r. 727-722 BC), m. Banitu
                - (?) SARGON II (r. 722-705 BC), m. (1) Atalia, (2) Ra'ima
                  - SENNACHERIB (r. 705-681 BC), m. (1) Tashmetu-sharrat, (2) Naqi'a
                    - Ashur-nadin-shumi
                    - Ashur-ili-muballissu
                    - Arda-mulissu
                    - Ashur-shumu-ushabshi
                    - ESARHADDON (r. 681-669 BC), m. Esharra-hammat
                      - Seru'a-etirat
                      - Sin-nadin-apli
                      - Shamash-shum-ukin
                      - ASHURBANIPAL (r. 669-631 BC), m. Libbali-sharrat
                        - ASHUR-ETIL-ILANI (r. 631-627 BC)
                        - SIN-SHAR-ISHKUN (r. 627-612 BC)
                          - ASHUR-UBALLIT II (r. 612-609 BC)
                      - (among others)
                    - Nergal-shumu-ibni
                    - Nabu-shar-usur
                    - Shadditu
                  - Ahat-abisha
                - Sin-ahu-usur

=== Shalmaneser's queen ===
The name of Shalmaneser V's wife and queen was Banitu. Her tomb was discovered in excavations at the Northwest Palace at Nimrud in 1988–1989, alongside a tablet with a funerary inscription. Curiously, the tomb contained two female skeletons but objects in the grave are attributed to three queens: Iabâ (queen of Tiglath-Pileser III), Banitu (queen of Shalmaneser V), and Atalia (queen of Sargon II). Among the various objects, a bronze cosmetic container and a golden bowl are attributed to Banitu. The most common assumption by historians is that the two bodies in the grave are those of Iabâ and Atalia, since the funerary inscription only records the name of Iabâ (the original owner of the grave) and the latest inscribed objects are attributed to Atalia. Since the inscription also includes a curse against any who disturbed the tomb, but Atalia was buried there anyway, it is possible that Atalia and Iabâ were closely related, Atalia perhaps being Iabâ's daughter. It would then be possible that the objects inscribed with Banitu's name actually belonged to Atalia, who had inherited them from the previous queen.

In 2008, the Assyriologist Stephanie Dalley proposed the alternative idea that Iabâ and Banitu were the same person, and that the name Iabâ (based on ascribing it a West Semitic origin and translating it into "beautiful") was translated into Akkadian as "Banitu". Dalley's proposal, since accepted by several prominent Assyriologists, such as Eckhart Frahm and Sarah C. Melville, implies that Iabâ would have been relatively young at the end of Tiglath-Pileser's reign (and thus not have been Shalmaneser's mother) and would then have been married by Shalmaneser after his father's death. There is another example of two successive kings sharing a queen; in the ninth century BC, Mullissu-mukannišat-Ninua is recorded as the queen of both Ashurnasirpal II and his successor Shalmaneser III, though it is not clear if she actually married Shalmaneser III or just retained the title. The equation of Iabâ with Banitu cannot be proven with certainty, as the etymological origin (possibly Arabic rather than West-Semitic) and meaning of "Iabâ" cannot be conclusively proven, and the name Banitu could just as likely be derived from the Akkadian word bānītu ("[divine] creatress") as banītu ("beautiful"). The hypothesis of equating the two is based solely on the possible similarity in the names, with no explicit evidence having been found.

In 2013, the Assyriologist David Kertai questioned the equation of Banitu and Iabâ, on a chronological basis. Examinations of the skeletons found in the tomb revealed that both women died at the age of about 30–35 and that their deaths were separated by 20–50 years. Based on this data, and the speculation that Banitu had to have died during Shalmaneser's short reign, and that Atalia died before Sargon II built his palace at Dur-Sharrukin in 707 BC (since she is not mentioned in the reliefs there), Kertai concluded that Banitu and Iabâ were two different women and that Iabâ (then possibly Shalmaneser's mother) must have died during Tiglath-Pileser's reign. The Assyriologist Saana Svärd defended the equation in 2015, stating that it was possible that Atalia died during the reign of Sargon II's successor Sennacherib and was buried in the same grave as Banitu, 20–50 years after the prior burial. Though chronological difficulties can thus be explained away, Keiko Yamada and Shigeo Yamada questioned in 2017 if it was truly likely that the queen of Sargon II would have been buried in the same grave as the queen of Shalmaneser V, who had been deposed and killed by Sargon II.

=== Siblings and children ===
If Sargon II was also a son of Tiglath-Pileser III, and thus Shalmaneser V's brother, the two had at least one more sibling, since Sargon's royal inscriptions speak of a brother called Sin-ahu-usur, who is attested during Sargon's reign as an "equal brother" and the "great vizier". Sin-ahu-usur is also known to have participated in some of Sargon's military campaigns, attested as present on one of his wars against Urartu in the north.

The commonly accepted hypothesis that Sargon II was not the legitimate heir of Shalmaneser V implies the existence of more legitimate heirs. In 2017, Keiko Yamada and Shigeo Yamada suggested that the palace official Ashur-dain-aplu was one of Shalmaneser V's sons. Ashur-dain-aplu is identified in a letter as the "son of Shalmaneser", meaning either Shalmaneser III or Shalmaneser V (as the name was only ever used by Assyrian kings and Shalmaneser IV was childless). There are other references to a son of Shalmaneser III by this name, but they are unlikely to be the same person as Ashur-dain-aplu seems supportive of the king (whereas Shalmaneser III's son by that name was a rebel). Additionally, official correspondence of the letter's type is rare from the time of Shalmaneser III but more common from the times of later kings. The letter was found at Nineveh, not made the Assyrian capital until the reign of Sennacherib, long after Shalmaneser III's death but just a few decades after Shalmaneser V's death. If he was Shalmaneser V's son, Ashur-dain-aplu through some means survived the turmoil and chaos at the end of his father's reign and even managed to continue his political career, holding prominent palace positions possibly as late as the reign of Esarhaddon (r. 681–669 BC), Sennacherib's successor.

== Titles ==
If Luckenbill's 1925 identification of the fragmentary Babylonian inscription representing an inscription by Shalmaneser V is correct, the king used the following titulature in that inscription:

[I am Shalmaneser], the mighty king, king of the Universe, king of Assyria, king of the Four Regions of the World, viceroy of Babylon, king of Sumer and Akkad, son of [...], king of Assyria; most precious scion of Assyria, seed of royalty, of the eternal days.

== Notes ==
Shalmaneser V Adaside dynasty Died: 722 BC
Preceded by Tiglath-Pileser III	King of Assyria; 727 – 722 BC	Succeeded by Sargon II
Preceded by Tiglath-Pileser III	King of Babylon; 727 – 722 BC	Succeeded by Marduk-apla-iddina II
