= Iaba, Banitu and Atalia =

Ancient Assyrian queens

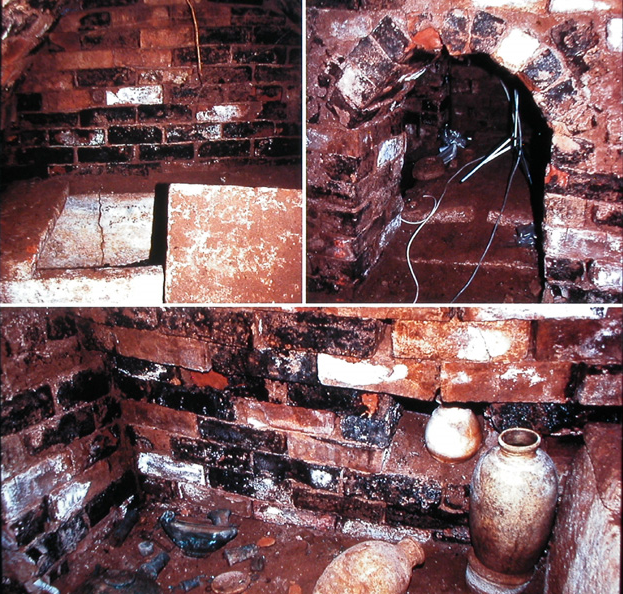
Photographs of Tomb II, from which the objects and remains of the queens have been recovered: the sarcophagus (upper left), an opening/entranceway (upper right) and the northern wall, with pottery (bottom)

Iaba (also called Yaba), Banitu, and Atalia were queens of the Neo-Assyrian Empire as the primary consorts (Note: Assyrian kings at times had multiple wives at the same time, but not all were recognized as queens (or "women of the palace", the actual term used in Assyria). Though it has been disputed in the past, it appears that only one woman bore the title at any given time, as the term typically appears without qualifiers (indicating a lack of ambiguity).) of the successive kings Tiglath-Pileser III (r. 745–727 BC), Shalmaneser V (r. 727–722 BC) and Sargon II (r. 722–705 BC), respectively. Little is known of the lives of the three queens; they were not known by name by modern historians prior to the 1989 discovery of a stone sarcophagus among the Queens' tombs at Nimrud which contained objects inscribed with the names of all three women. The stone sarcophagus, believed to originally have been the tomb of Iaba since her name is on the nearby funerary inscription, presents a problem of identification as it contains objects with the names of three queens, but contains only two skeletons. The conventional interpretation is that the skeletons are those of Iaba (since it was originally her tomb) and Atalia (since her objects have to be the latest in the tomb), but several alternate hypotheses have also been made, such as the idea that Iaba and Banitu could be the same person. Iaba and Banitu being the same person is however not supported by either historical or chronological evidence.

The names of the queens have aroused some interest since out of the three names, only Banitu appears to be an Akkadian (the language of ancient Assyria) name. Various etymological origins have been proposed for the other names; Iaba has variously been identified as a Levantine, Aramean, Arabic or Hebrew name, and Atalia has also variously been identified as Hebrew or Arabic. Since Iaba's funerary inscription includes a curse against anyone who disturbs her tomb, it is possible that she and Atalia were related (as such perhaps circumventing the curse).

The bones discovered in the Nimrud tombs have been the subject of paleopathological research since the 1990s, which has made it possible to gain some insight into the lives and health of the ancient queens. Iaba suffered from several health issues, including chronic sinusitis and perhaps neoplastic meningitis. Out of all the queens found in the tombs at Nimrud, Atalia had by far the most health issues. Atalia's bones suggest that the queen suffered from mild arthritis and the early stages of Scheuermann's disease. Her most painful condition was inflammations within her skull, a recurring and incurable affliction which caused immense head pain.

== Names and backgrounds ==
The three names of the queens are unusually short and modest compared to the names of some of the other known Assyrian queens, such as Shammuramat and Libbali-sharrat. Iaba's name is inscribed in cuneiform as ^{f}ia-ba-a, transliterated as Iabâ or Yabâ. The name, clearly not of Akkadian origin, might be of either West Semitic, perhaps Levantine or Aramean, or Arabic origin, with possible roots including yph ("beautiful"), nby ("to name") and yhb ("to give").

Banitu's name is inscribed in cuneiform as ^{f}ba-ni-ti, transliterated as Banītu, Banîtu, Banêti, Banīti or Banitu. Just like Iaba, Banitu might also mean "beautiful" (banītu in Akkadian), but it might also be derived from the Akkadian bānītu, which means "(divine) Creatress". Simo Parpola believes the name Banitu to be of Babylonian origin, and as a consequence speculates that Queen Banitu might have been a Babylonian princess, brought to Assyria as a hostage after Tiglath-Pileser's conquest of Babylon in 729 BC.

Atalia's name is inscribed in cuneiform as ^{f}a-ta-li-a or ^{f}a-tal-ia-a, depending on the inscription, transliterated as Atalia, Ataliā, Ataliya or Ataliyā. The name is clearly not of Akkadian origin. In 1998, Stephanie Dalley proposed that both Iaba and Atalia were actually names of Hebrew origin and speculated that they were both princesses of the Kingdom of Judah, from the same royal family. Dalley based her argument on the name Atalia being similar, and perhaps etymologically identical, to the name Athaliah (borne by a Judean queen who ruled about a century earlier), that the ending of the name (i-a or ia-a) could represent a theophoric element deriving from Yahweh, and that Atalia and Iaba might have been related. (Note: For further discussion on the hypothesis that the two were related, see the "Identification" section) Dalley also argued that the inter-marriage of the Assyrian and Judean royal families could help explain why Sargon II's successor Sennacherib (r. 705–681 BC), who warred against Hezekiah of Judah, in his inscriptions refer to Hezekiah as "strong and mighty", highly unusual epithets for the Assyrians to bestow upon an enemy.

Dalley's arguments have met with both support and opposition and the idea that the names were Hebrew has also been independently forwarded by Simo Parpola. In 2002, K. Lawson Younger pointed out that it was far from certain that i-a or ia-a actually corresponded to Yahweh since there are few analogues in other Neo-Assyrian names and inscriptions. The identification of Atalia as a Hebrew name was also doubted by Nicholas Postgate in 2008, and in that year Ran Zadok alternatively suggested that Atalia was an Arabic name.

== Content of Tomb II ==
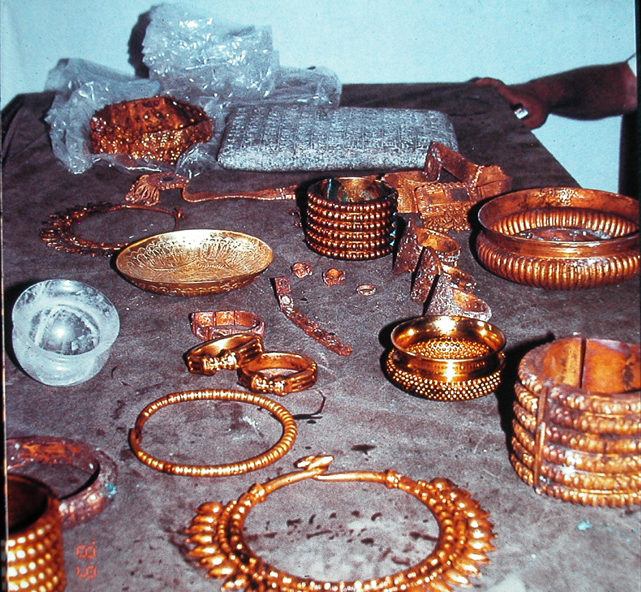
Various objects from Tomb II after excavation

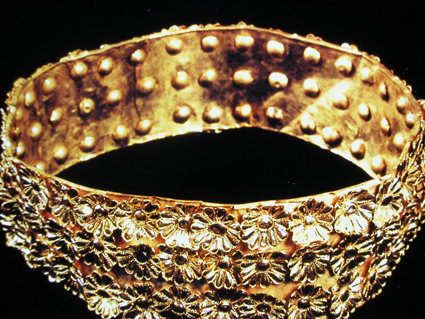
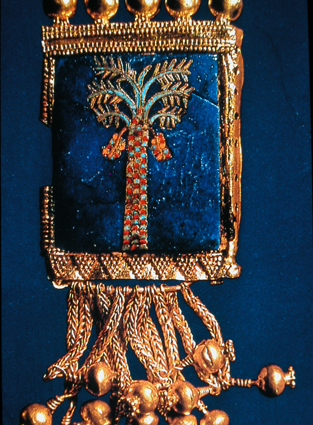
Close-up of a golden crown (left) and a decorative plaque (right) from Tomb II

The tomb containing the remains of the queens was uncovered during excavations at the Northwest Palace of Ashurnasirpal II (r. 883–859 BC) in Nimrud in the late 1980s, by the Iraqi Department of Antiquities. While excavating portions of the residential quarters of the Northwest Palace in 1988, an unevenness of the floor was noted and soon, the chamber of tombs below was discovered. The tombs were excavated and examined 1988–1990. Tomb II, which contains the finds relevant to Iaba, Banitu and Atalia, was discovered and excavated in 1989. Although the tombs were immediately recognized as extraordinary on account of the great treasures contained within them, their discovery was soon overshadowed by the Gulf War (1991), which meant that scientific study of the tombs thereafter was a slow process. Out of the over two dozen individuals found in the tombs many remain unidentified given that inscriptions do not provide identifications for all the bodies and tombs. The many individuals were spread out in four different chambers, buried in three bronze coffins, two clay coffins and three sarcophagi made of stone. The finds relevant to Iaba, Banitu and Atalia were discovered in and around the stone sarcophagus in the chamber designated Tomb II.

Iaba, Banitu and Atalia were not known by name prior to the discovery of the tomb. The find of the tombs, which contained other remains and names as well, nearly doubled the number of Neo-Assyrian queens known by name. On an alabaster tablet recording a funerary inscription, found in the alcove of the tomb's antechamber, Iaba's name is recorded and she is described as the queen, though the name of her husband is not mentioned. Iaba's name also appears on two golden bowls found in the sarcophagus, where she is explicitly called the "queen of Tiglath-Pileser". Apart from these bowls, five other inscribed objects were also found in the sarcophagus. Three (a rock crystal jar, bronze mirror and another golden bowl) are inscribed with "Atalia, queen of Sargon" and two (a bronze cosmetic container and a fourth golden bowl) are inscribed with "Banitu, queen of Shalmaneser". There are also numerous objects in the tomb that are not inscribed with any name, including bracelets, bowls and two golden crowns. In total Tomb II contained 26 kilograms (57 lbs) of gold objects. Several of these are marked with a scorpion symbol, often used for royal women, rather than a specific name.

The sarcophagus contained two female skeletons, one buried on top of the other. The lower skeleton has been designated Body II B and the upper skeleton has been designated Body II A. The skeletons were covered with burnt remains of linen garments. For security reasons, the bones and treasures of the tomb were placed in plastic bags and taken to the Mosul Museum on the same day they were discovered. There were several alabaster jars found in the tomb, one of which included brown and decomposed organic material. Analysis of this material has ruled it out being a heart, liver or kidney but it may be a dehydrated brain, of unclear origin.

== Identification ==
The tomb, clearly originally belonging to Iaba since her name is on the funerary inscription, presents a problem of identification since it contains the inscriptions of three queens but only contains two skeletons. It is generally assumed that the bodies belong to two of the three queens. Several explanations for there only being two bodies, but accompanied by the names of three queens, have been proposed since the discovery of the tomb. Most scholars assume that the two bodies belong to Iaba, clearly the original occupant of the tomb, and Atalia, the latest name that appears on the inscribed objects. The items inscribed with Banitu's name could then have been buried with Atalia, who was buried alongside items from various other kings as well (such as the Babylonian kings Kurigalzu II and Marduk-zakir-shumi I). It is even possible that Atalia, after her husband deposed Shalmaneser, took the objects with Banitu's name as trophies.

A popular alternative hypothesis, (Note: Other alternate hypotheses include Banitu being either the older skeleton or the younger one, though neither of these suggestions have received much attention.) first proposed by Stephanie Dalley in 2008, is that Iaba and Banitu were actually the same person, with Iaba being her name in Hebrew or Aramean and Banitu being her name in Akkadian. There are examples of royal women in Assyria changing their name or using two names, notably the later queen Naqi'a, who is also known as Zakutû. Dalley also argued that while Banitu's objects could be in the tomb as trophies taken by Atalia, it is unclear why Atalia then would not erase the old queen's name from them and inscribe her own. As explained previously, it is possible to translate both names to mean "beautiful", but that is far from the only possible translation. Shalmaneser V, in this scenario not the son of Iaba, would thus have married his father's widow to further strengthen his position as king.

There are issues with the idea that Iaba and Banitu were the same person, one prominent issue being that the two names are never used interchangeably in the surviving material. In 2013, David Kertai opposed identifying Iaba and Banitu as the same person from a chronological standpoint. Microscopic investigations of the preservation of the skeletons have demonstrated that the two queens were buried at least 20 years (though possibly as much as 50 years) apart and that both died aged approximately 30–35. If Iaba and Banitu were the same person, she would have had to have died during or after Shalmaneser's reign. Atalia, as Sargon's queen cannot have died earlier than 722 BC but was probably dead before 707/706 BC since the royal court was in that year moved to the new city Dur-Sharrukin and she is not attested in the reign of Sennacherib. Even if limiting the gap between the two burials to 20 years, Iaba and Banitu could then only be the same person if Atalia died very late in Sargon's reign. Saana Svärd defended Dalley's hypothesis in 2015 by suggesting that Ataliya was "deposed" as queen sometime before the end of Sargon's reign and actually died in the reign of Sennacherib, 20–50 years after the death of Iaba/Banitu, and was buried in the same tomb. In 2017, Keiko Yamada and Shigeo Yamada questioned this hypothesis by wondering if it was really likely that Sargon's queen would be buried together with the queen of Shalmaneser, whom Sargon had deposed and by pointing out that the hypothesis that Iaba and Banitu were the same person was based solely in one of several possible interpretations of the meanings of their names since no inscription otherwise designates them as the same and the two names do not appear together on any of the objects.

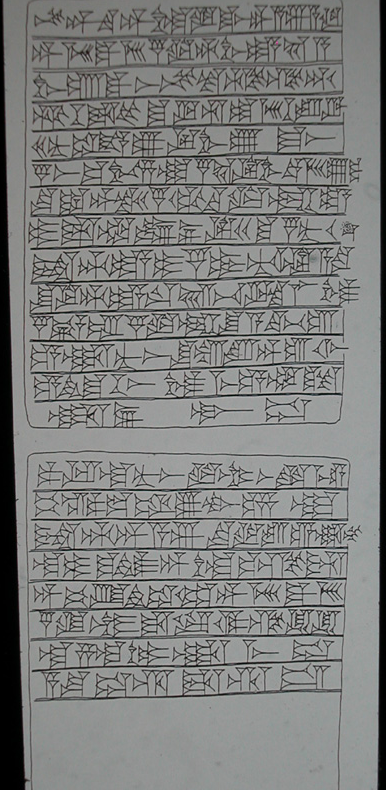
Cuneiform text of Iaba's funerary inscription

Iaba's funerary inscription contains a curse against disturbing her tomb. In full, the inscription reads:

By the name of Shamash, Ereshkigal and the Anunnaki, the great gods of the earth, mortal destiny overtook Iaba, the queen, in death, she went to the path of her ancestors.
Whomever, in the future, be it a queen who sits on the throne or a palace lady who is a concubine of the king, removes me from my tomb, or puts anybody else with me, and lays their hand upon my jewelry with evil intent or breaks open the seal of that tomb, above (earth), under the rays of the sun, let their spirit roam outside in thirst, below in the underworld, when libations of water are offered, they must not receive with the Anunnaki as a funerary offering any beer, wine or meal. May Ningishzida and the great door-keeper, Bitu, the great gods of the underworld, afflict their corpse and ghost with eternal restlessness!

Perhaps the fact that another body was buried in Iaba's tomb later on in direct violation of the inscription demonstrates that whoever was buried was somehow "immune" from this curse. This could be explained by the possibility that the two queens in Tomb II were closely related. Though it has thus in the past been suggested, first by Muayyad Said Damerji in 1999, that Iaba and Atalia were mother and daughter, it would not have been appropriate for Sargon to marry his sister, (Note: Though whether Sargon II was actually Tiglath-Pileser III's son, as he claimed to be, is disputed.) and there are no other known cases of incestuous marriages in ancient Assyria. Still, it is possible that they were close relatives in some other arrangement.

== Paleopathology ==
The bones discovered in the Nimrud tombs have been the subject of paleopathological research since the 1990s. Across the seventeen different individuals found, common health issues include stiff joints, childhood illness, headaches, allergies and colds. Many of the individuals, though their dental hygiene was good relative to the average ancient Assyrian, suffered from dental problems. In ancient Assyria it was not possible to treat periodontal abscesses, fill dental cavities or to scrape off dental plaque.

=== Body II B (Iaba) ===
The lower body, typically identified as Iaba, having been buried decades earlier than the upper one is not indicated solely by it being placed furthest down, but also by the bones being in a more advanced stage of decomposition and that it appears to have been damaged when the upper body was placed in the sarcophagus. The bones of Iaba were upon their discovery far more brittle than those of Atalia, perhaps due to the later opening of the tomb or due to heat exposure.

Iaba's bones reveal that she suffered from several health issues in her life. The interior of her skulls suggests that she had suffered from several minor brain tumors, probably the result of neoplastic meningitis. Analysis of the jaw and teeth showed that Iaba also suffered from a severe inflammation of the gums and dental abscesses which resulted in the loss of two teeth. Although no dental plaque was detected on any of the surviving teeth, it was likely present. Iaba suffered from slight wear to some of her joints; slight signs of wear were found in the right elbow and right knee joints, with stronger signs of wear found in the left hip joint. The spine shows signs of the early stages of osteoarthritis and further signs of wear was also found in the joints of some of the vertebrae. Iaba also suffered from chronic sinusitis.

=== Body II A (Atalia) ===
The upper skeleton in the sarcophagus, smaller than the lower one and typically identified as Atalia, had by far the most health issues of any of the seventeen individuals buried in the tombs at Nimrud. Like the other queen, Atalia appears to have died aged approximately 30–35, and her body was after death for unknown reasons (Note: Possible explanations include that this was for preservation purposes, for transportation purposes or to prevent the spread of some disease she might have had.) roasted or smoked for several hours (at a temperature in the range 150–250 °C; 302–482 °F) before being wrapped in a shroud. Compared to the other queens, Atalia's dental health was notably bad; her first premolar has a cavity and she suffered not only from dental plaque but also from an abscess and from inflammation in her gums. Problems were not limited to the teeth; both her frontal sinuses exhibit evidence of inflammation and though she was at most 35 years old at the time of death, several of Atalia's vertebrae, as well as her ankle joints, hips, shoulders and knees show signs of mild arthritis. Atalia's vertebrae show some features that may suggest that she was suffering from the early stages of Scheuermann's disease, which eventually produces a "hunchback". Perhaps this condition was brought on by cancer weakening Atalia's bone structure, osteoporosis, or some unknown infection. Because Atalia's teeth exhibit linear enamel hypoplasia, it is evident that she at some point in her childhood suffered from a severe long-term illness. At some point she also pulled a leg muscle and at another point, she broke one of her toes.

Atalia's perhaps most painful condition was revealed by the frontal, parietal and occipital bones of her skull being thickened. The inner surfaces of these bones suggest that Atalia, due to her meninges reacting to the thickening, suffered from inflammation within the skull so severe that the swelling blood vessels changed the interior of the skull bones. This recurring and incurable condition would have caused immense pain. A number of stone amulets found in Tomb II contain spells meant to protect against head pain. Though no name is inscribed on these, they likely belonged to Atalia.

== Fate of the bones ==
Around 2002, there were rumors that the bones of the two queens from Tomb II, and the other royal individuals in the tombs, were to be honored with a state funeral and reburied. Any such plans never came to fruition. In 2015, the bones were still stored at the Mosul Museum. That year, the ruins of the Northwest Palace were destroyed by the Islamic State and the Mosul Museum was also attacked, leaving the fate of the royal remains unclear. The gold from Tomb II is stored at the Baghdad Museum and unscathed.
