= Edwin Norris =

British philologist and orientalist

- Born: 24 October 1795; Taunton, Somerset, England
- Died: 10 December 1872 (aged 77); London, England

Academic work
- Discipline: Philologist
- Institutions: East India Company; Royal Asiatic Society of Great Britain and Ireland; British and Foreign Bible Society; Foreign Office

Edwin Norris (24 October 1795 – 10 December 1872) was a British philologist, linguist and intrepid orientalist who wrote or compiled numerous works on the languages of Asia and Africa. His best-known works are his uncompleted Assyrian Dictionary and his translation and annotation of the three plays of the Cornish Ordinalia.

== Biography ==
Norris was born on 24 October 1795 in Taunton, Somerset, England. His father was a printer and he was educated at a local school where his uncle was headmaster. He did not attend university, but would later be awarded an honorary Doctor of Philosophy (hon. PhD) degree by the University of Bonn. After leaving school, he worked with his father for a time. From 1814 or 1815 to 1821, he worked in continental Europe as a private tutor and translator, having learnt the Neapolitan language, Italian, French, modern Greek, Hebrew, and Armenian. He then returned to Taunton and became a language teacher.

In 1825 or 1826, Norris joined the East India Company as a junior clerk at the East India House, their London headquarters. During his work there, he acquired a knowledge of number of south Asian languages. In 1836, Norris he left the East India Company and joined the Royal Asiatic Society of Great Britain and Ireland as an assistant secretary. He rose to become secretary of the Royal Asiatic Society from 1856. His duties include running the society's academic journal (Journal of the Royal Asiatic Society) and overseeing its official correspondence. He then served as librarian and honorary secretary from 1861 until his death.

Due to his extensive linguistic knowledge, one estimate is 26 separate languages, he also undertook work as a translator. From 1830, he assisted the British and Foreign Bible Society on translation projects, including their translations of the Bible into Berber, Maori, Persian, and Arabic. Between 1847 and 1866, he was translator at the Foreign Office. Through this latter work, he was selected to edit the papers of James Richardson, a British explorer of Africa: this resulted in Norris compiling a grammar of the Bornu language, which was published in 1853. He also translated and annotated the Cornish language manuscript from the Middle Ages known as the three plays of the Ordinalia, which are one of the most important relics of the Celtic dialect of Cornish (published in 1859 by the Oxford University Press as Ancient Cornish Drama). This is one of his more recognised works.

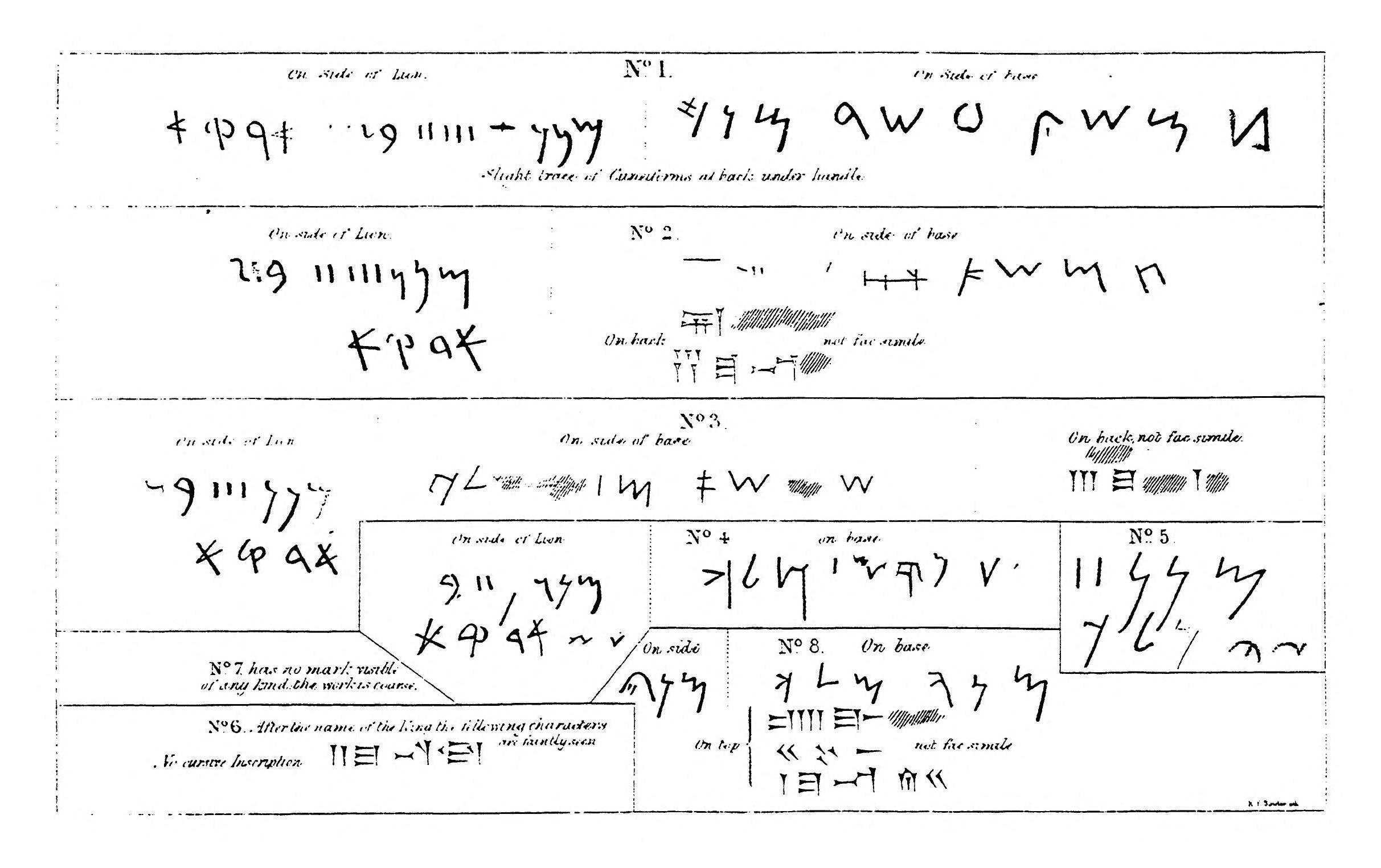
Assyrian Lion weight inscriptions by Norris

Norris also worked on Assyrian culture with major contributions. On behalf of the Royal Asiatic Society, he correspond with Henry Creswicke Rawlinson from 1838, and oversaw the publication of Rawlinsons's work on the Behistun Inscription in 1847 and 1851, including designing a cuneiform typeface and making corrections. He also assisted with Rawlinsons's work on the British Museum's collection (Cuneiform Inscriptions of Western Asia, 1861–1866). He independently deciphered the Assyrian lion weights from Nineveh and he discovered the weight measurement system of this civilisation and established conversions in 1853. He also started the Assyrian Dictionary; this uncompleted work is one of his more well known works outside Cornwall and widely considered a landmark in the history of cuneiform. The work was meant to further the study of the cuneiform inscriptions of Assyria and Babylonia but was unfinished at the time of his death in 1872.

== Works ==
- Outline of a Vocabulary of a Few of the Principal Languages of Western and Central Africa. London: John W. Parker, West Strand. 1841.
- Grammar of the Bornu or Kanuri Language. London: Harrison & Sons, St. Martin's Lane. 1853.
- The Ancient Cornish Drama. 2 vols. Oxford: University Press. 1859. (Reissued in 2 vols.:- New York; London: Benjamin Blom, 1968)
- Sketch of Cornish Grammar. Oxford: University Press. 1859. (part of The Ancient Cornish Drama, vol. 2)
- Assyrian Dictionary: intended to further the study of the cuneiform inscriptions of Assyria and Babylonia. 3 parts. London: Williams & Norgate. 1868–72. (Contains A-Nst; no more published. Reissued by Adamant Media Corporation, 2004 ISBNs 1421262886, 1421262878, 142126286X)
