= Shulmanu =

Mesopotamian deity

Shulmanu or Shulman (Assyrian Akkadian: Salmānu, Babylonian Akkadian: Šulmānu) was an ancient Mesopotamian deity. The deity is only ever recorded as having been worshipped by the ancient Assyrians, in contrast to many other deities of the Mesopotamian pantheon which were more universal, and was particularly popular in the Middle Assyrian period. The deity's name was incorporated into the name Shalmaneser, assumed as a regnal name by five Assyrian kings from Shalmaneser I (r. 1274–1245 BC) to Shalmaneser V (r. 727–722 BC). The literal translation of the name Salmānu is "friendly one"; it is possible that Shulmanu was a friendly manifestation of the Assyrian national deity Ashur.
