= Assyrian lion weights =

Ancient Assyrian lion statues

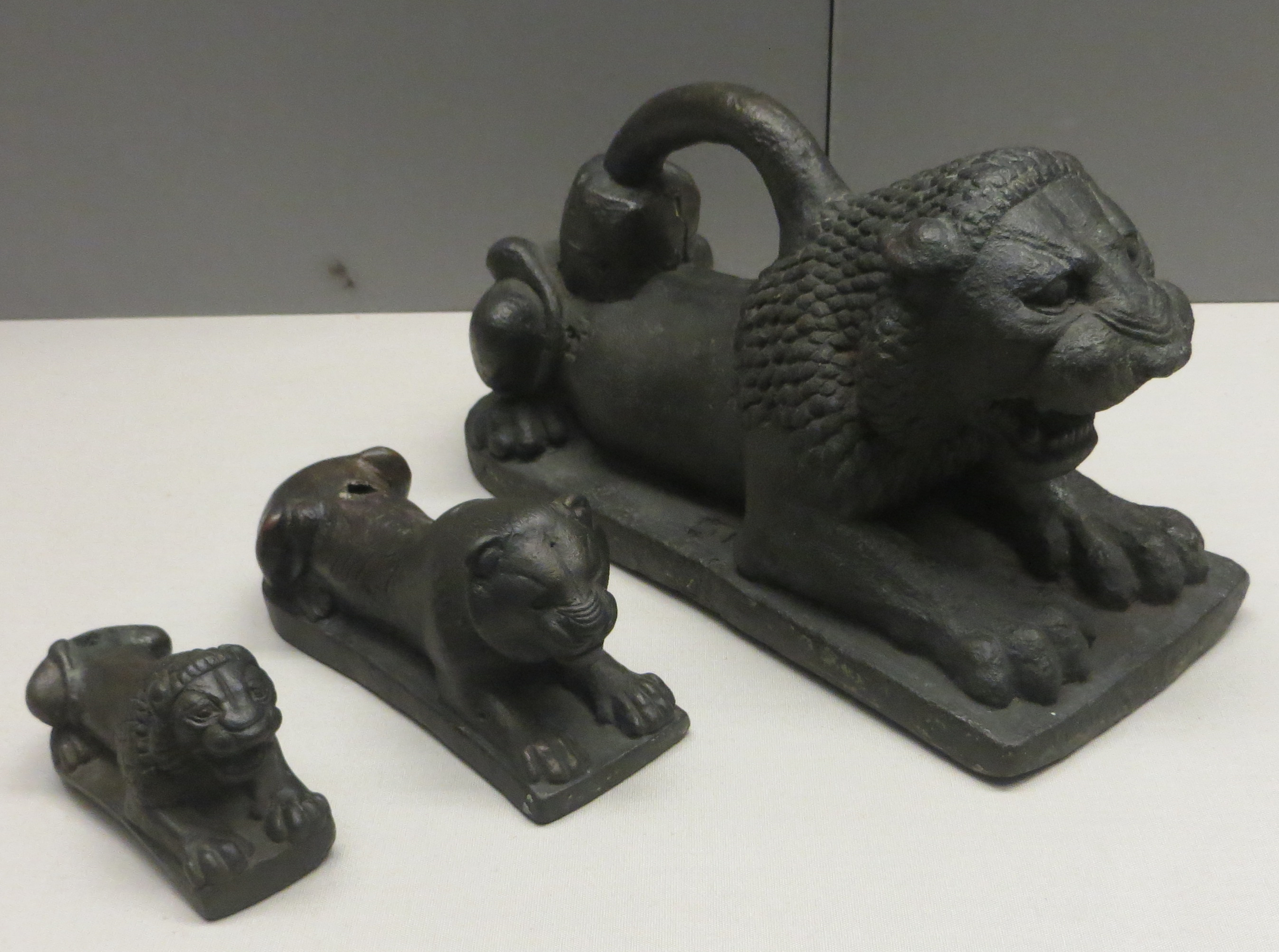
- Three of the lion weights in the British Museum. The table below lists all the known lion and duck weights from Nimrud as of the late 19th century.

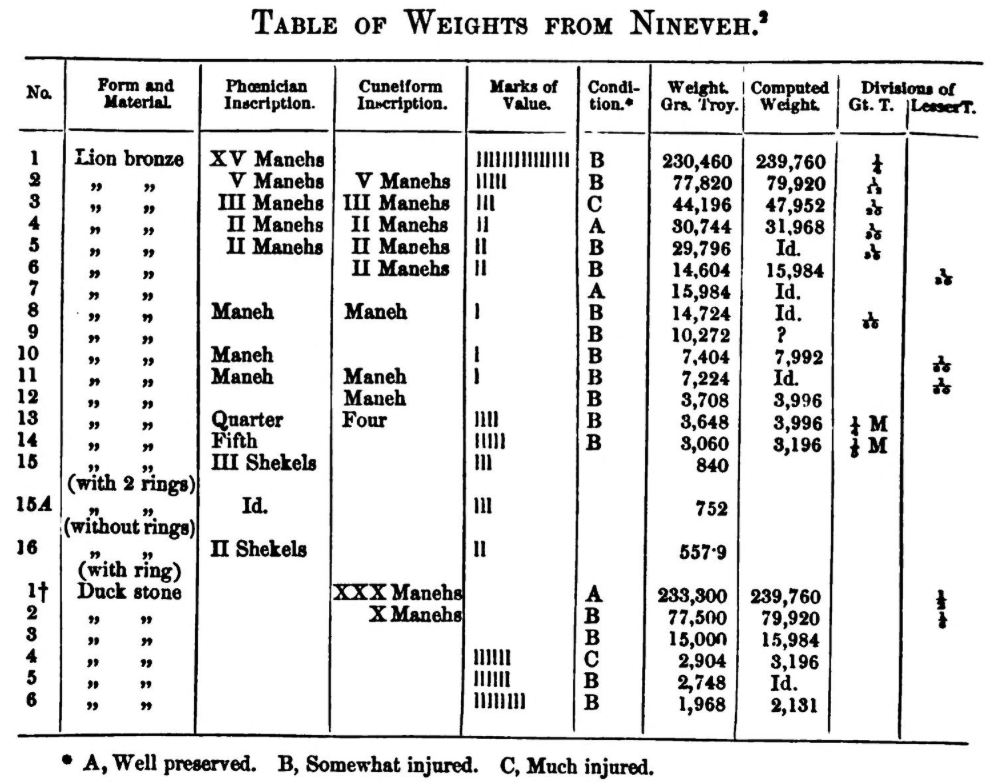
- Material: Bronze
- Writing: Phoenician language and cuneiform
- Created: c. 800–700 BC
- Discovered: 1845–51
- Present location: British Museum
- Identification: ME 91220

The Assyrian lion weights are a group of bronze statues of lions, discovered in archaeological excavations in or adjacent to ancient Assyria.

The first published, and the most notable, are a group of sixteen bronze Mesopotamian weights found at Nimrud in the late 1840s and now in the British Museum. They are considered to date from the 8th century BCE, with bilingual inscriptions in both cuneiform and Phoenician characters; the latter inscriptions are known as CIS II 1-14.

== Nimrud weights ==
The Nimrud weights date from the 8th century BCE and have bilingual inscriptions in both cuneiform and Phoenician characters. The Phoenician inscriptions are epigraphically from the same period as the Mesha Stele. They are one of the most important groups of artifacts evidencing the "Aramaic" form of the Phoenician script. At the time of their discovery, they were the oldest Phoenician-style inscription that had been discovered.

The weights were discovered by Austen Henry Layard in his earliest excavations at Nimrud (1845–51). A pair of lamassu were found at a gateway, one of which had fallen against the other and had broken into several pieces. After lifting the statue, Layard's team discovered under it sixteen lion weights. The artefacts were first deciphered by Edwin Norris, who confirmed that they had originally been used as weights.

The set form a regular series diminishing in size from 30 cm to 2 cm in length. The larger weights have handles cast on to the bodies, and the smaller have rings attached to them. The group of weights also included stone weights in the shape of ducks. The weights represent the earliest known uncontested example of the Aramaic numeral system. Eight of the lions are represented with the only known inscriptions from the short reign of Shalmaneser V. Other similar bronze lion weights were excavated at Abydos in western Turkey (also in the British Museum) and the Iranian site of Susa by the French archaeologist Jacques de Morgan (now in the Louvre in Paris).

There are two known systems of weights and measures from the ancient Middle East. One system was based on a weight called the mina which could be broken down into sixty smaller weights called shekels. These lion weights, however, come from a different system which was based on the heavy mina which weighed about a kilogram. This system was still being used in the Persian period and is thought to have been used for weighing metals.

The Lion weights were catalogued as CIS II 1-14, making them the first Aramaic inscription in the monumental Corpus Inscriptionum Semiticarum

=== Gallery ===
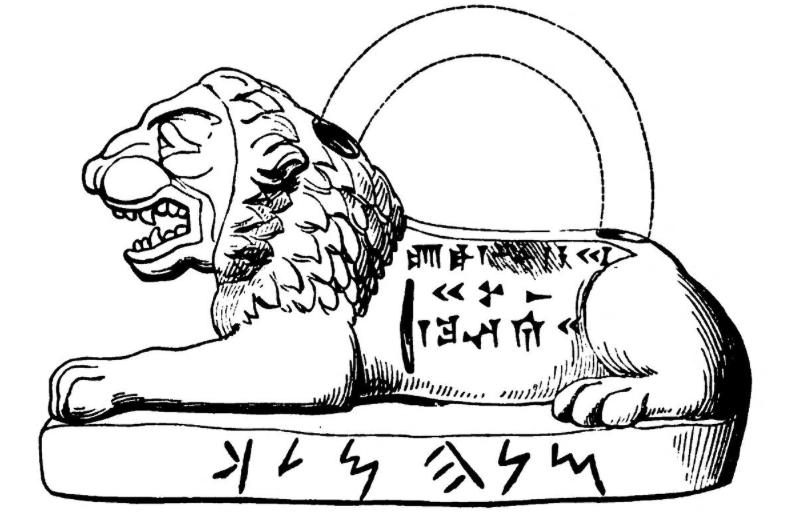
1864 sketch of a Lion weight

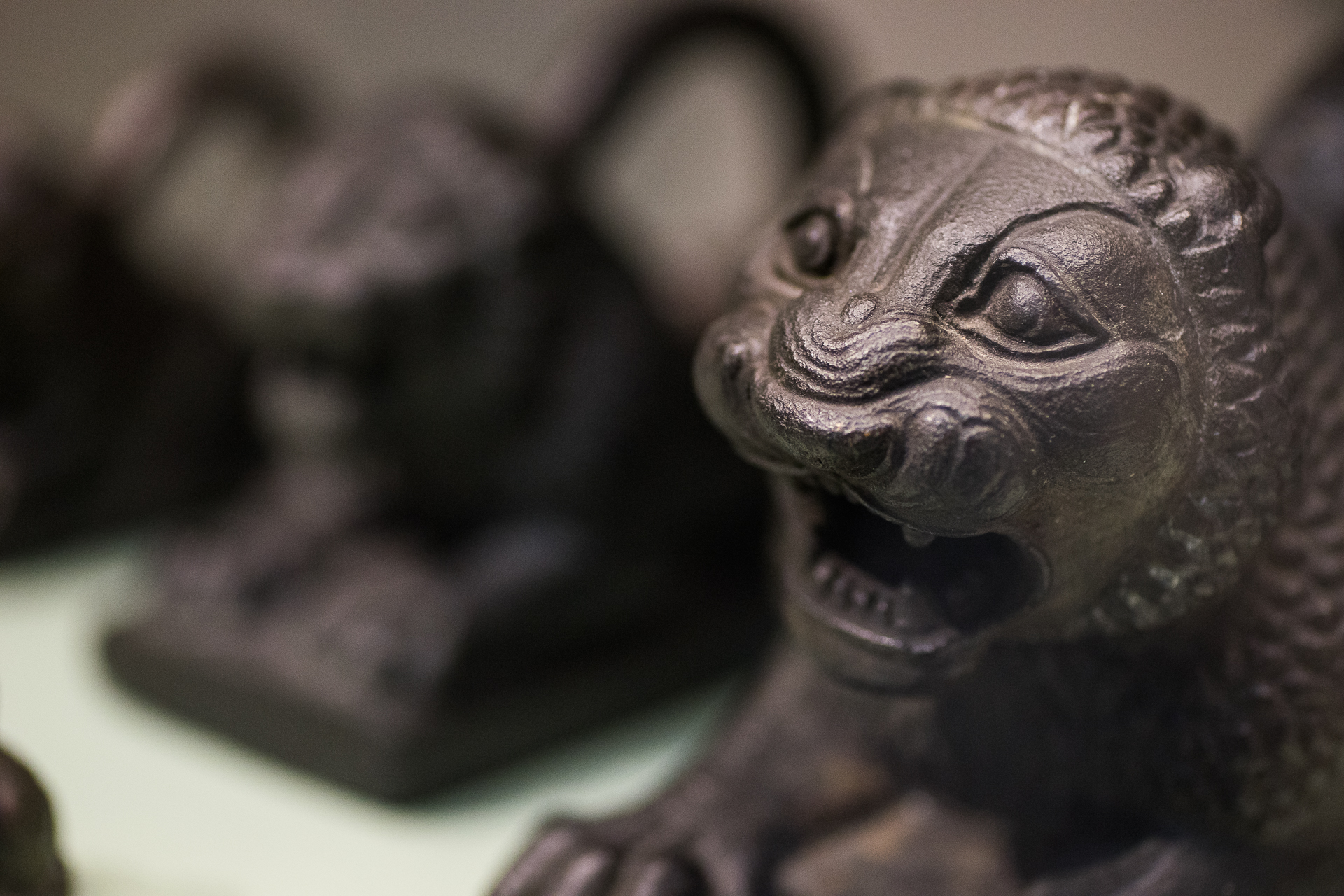
Close up

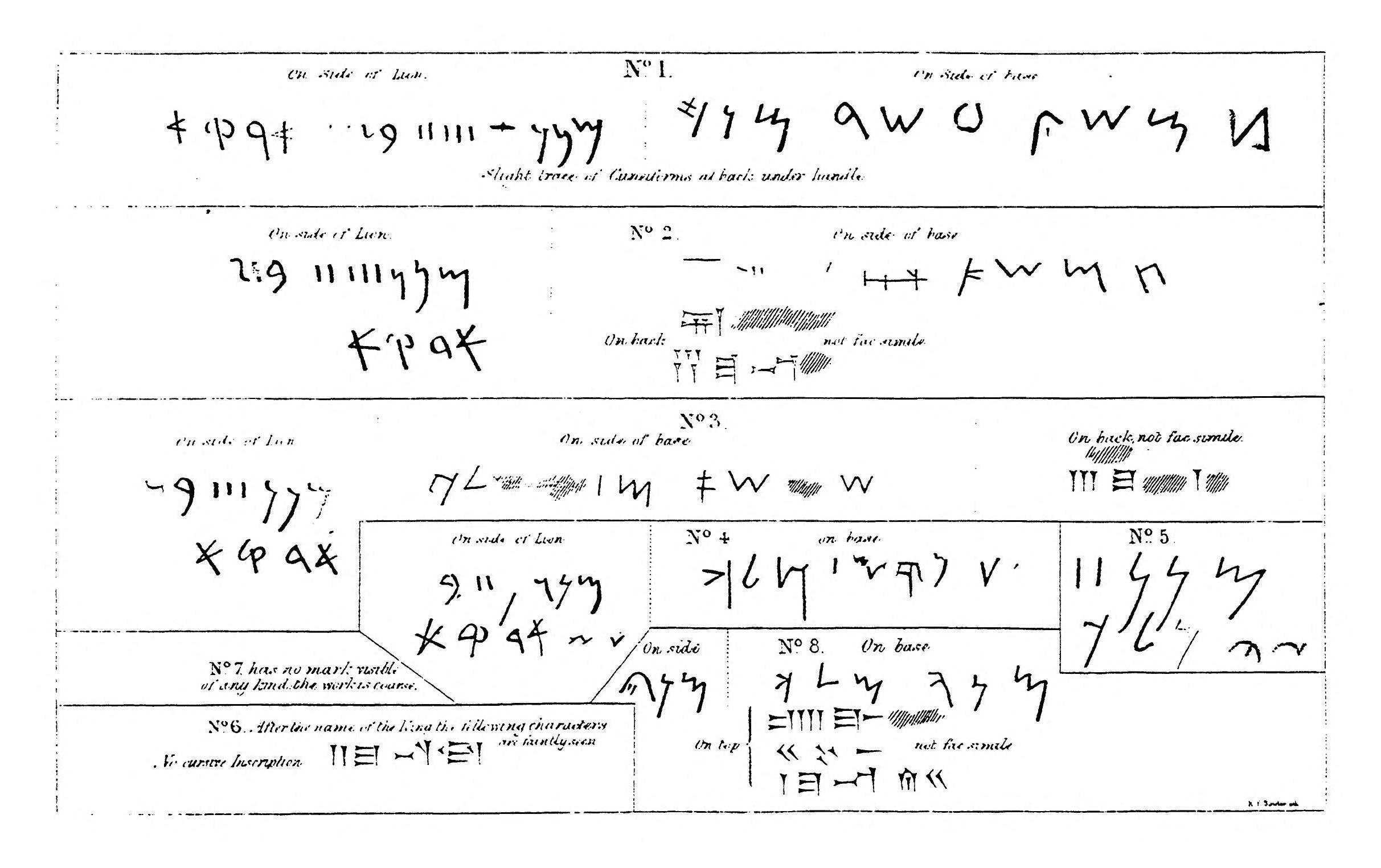
1856 sketch of the inscriptions from Lions 1-8

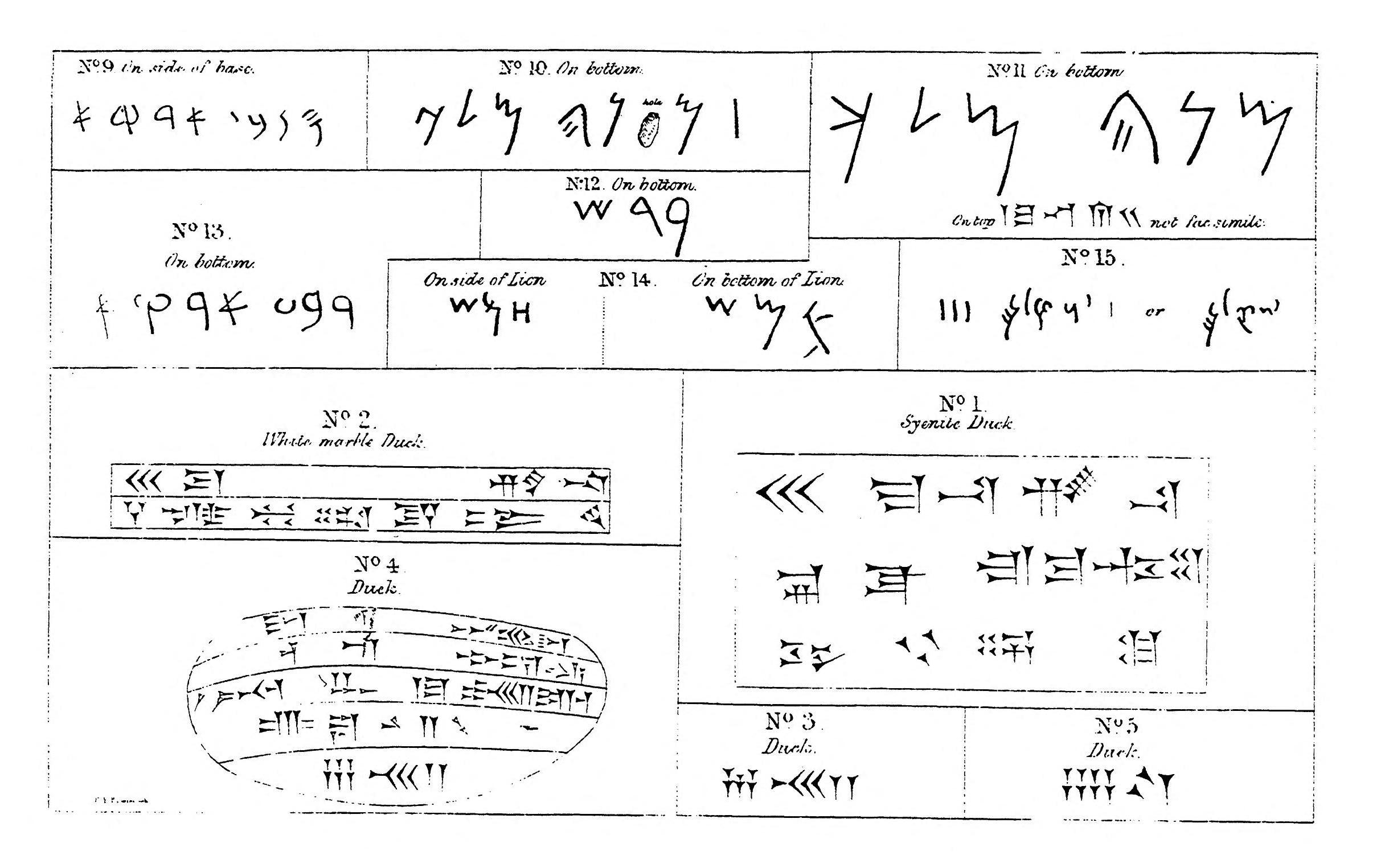
1856 sketch of the inscriptions from Lions 9-15 and Ducks 1-5

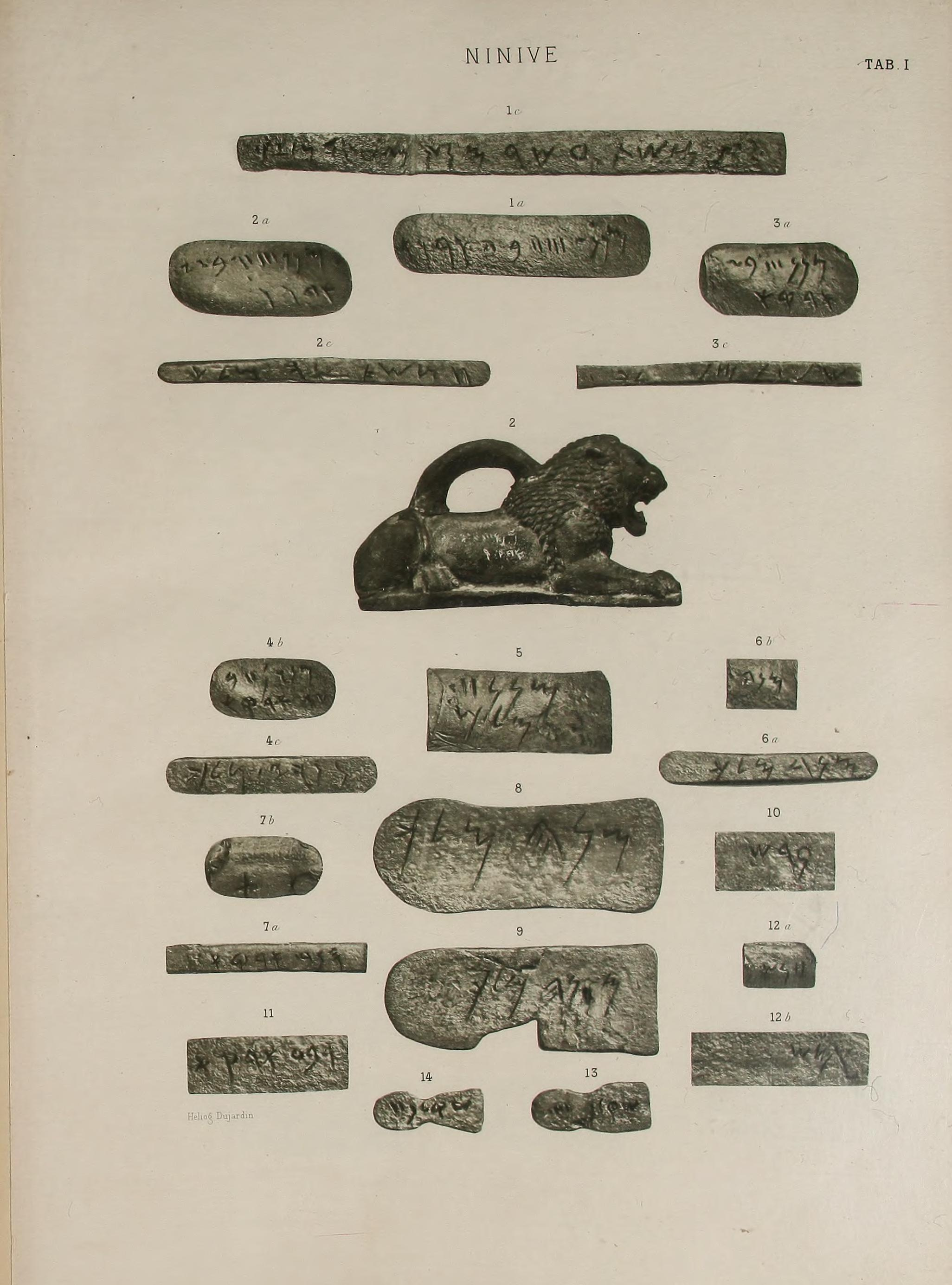
The Lion weights in the CIS

== Abydos weight ==
The second discovery of a lion weight (measuring 35.5cm long) was in Abydos (modern Turkey), dated to the 5th century BCE. It is currently in the British Museum, with ID number E32625.

It contains an Aramaic inscription known as KAI 263 or CIS II 108.

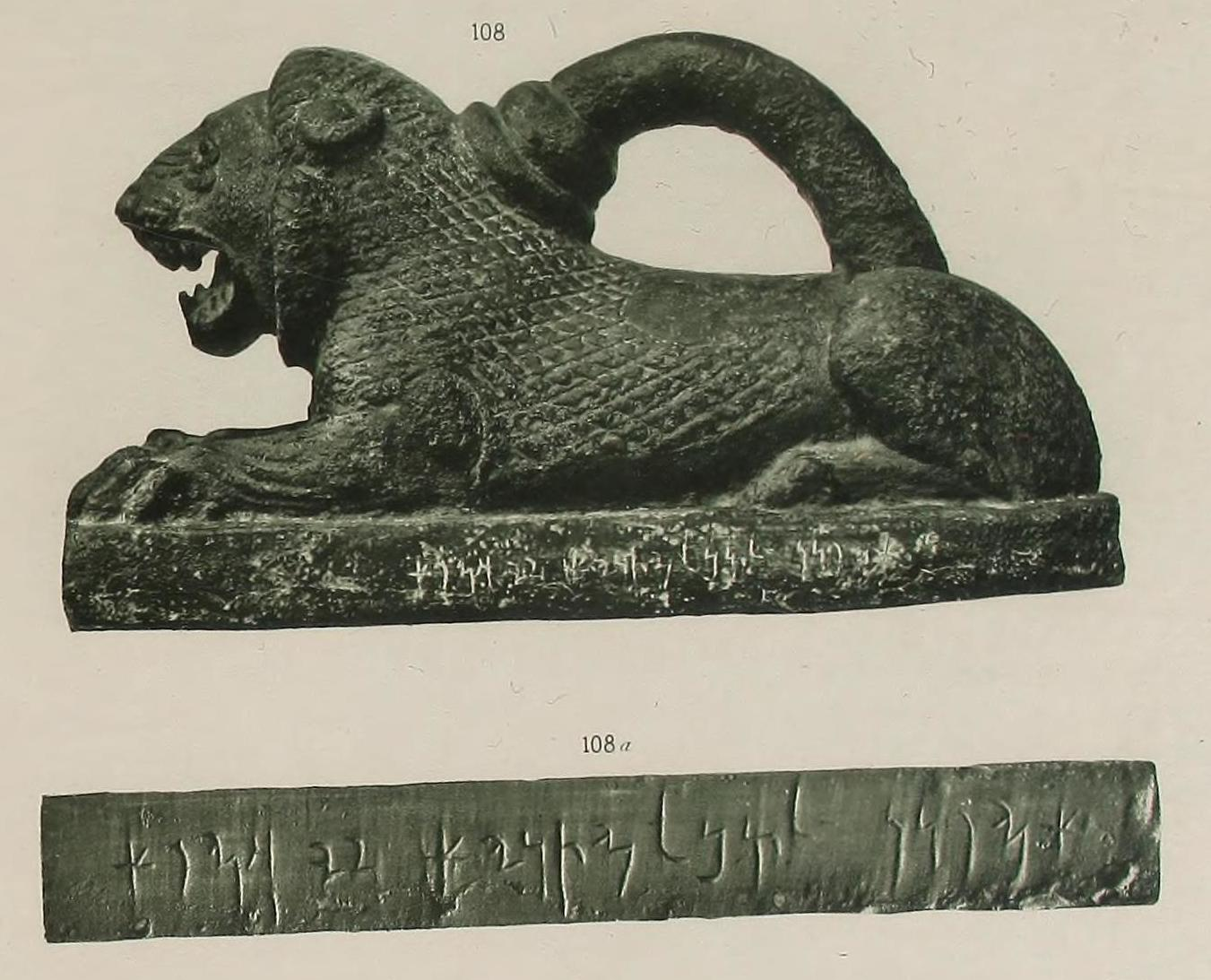
Another large Assyrian lion weight with Aramaic inscription in the British Museum's collection, from Abydos, Turkey, 5th century BC

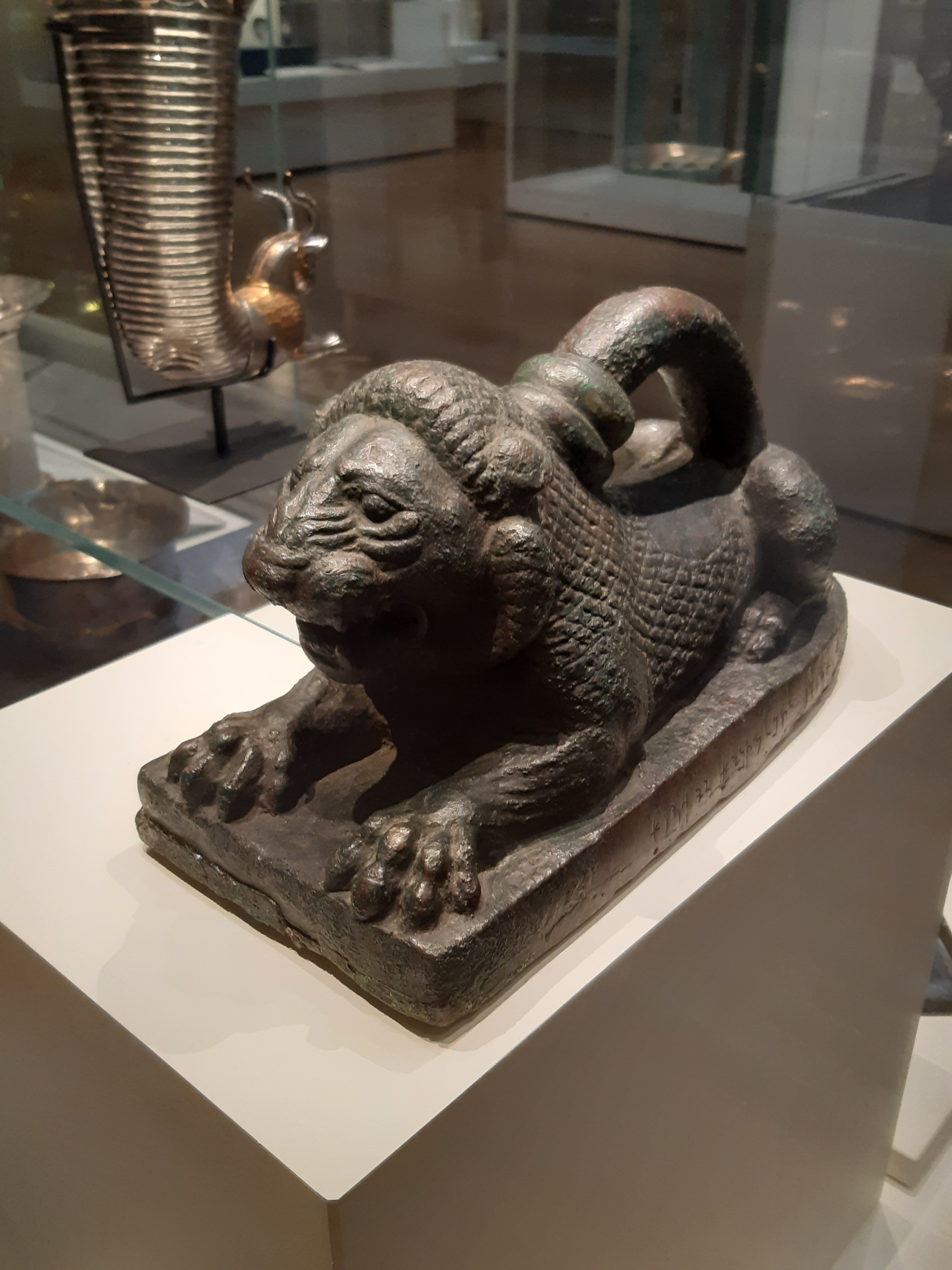
Contemporary picture of BM lion weight from Abydos

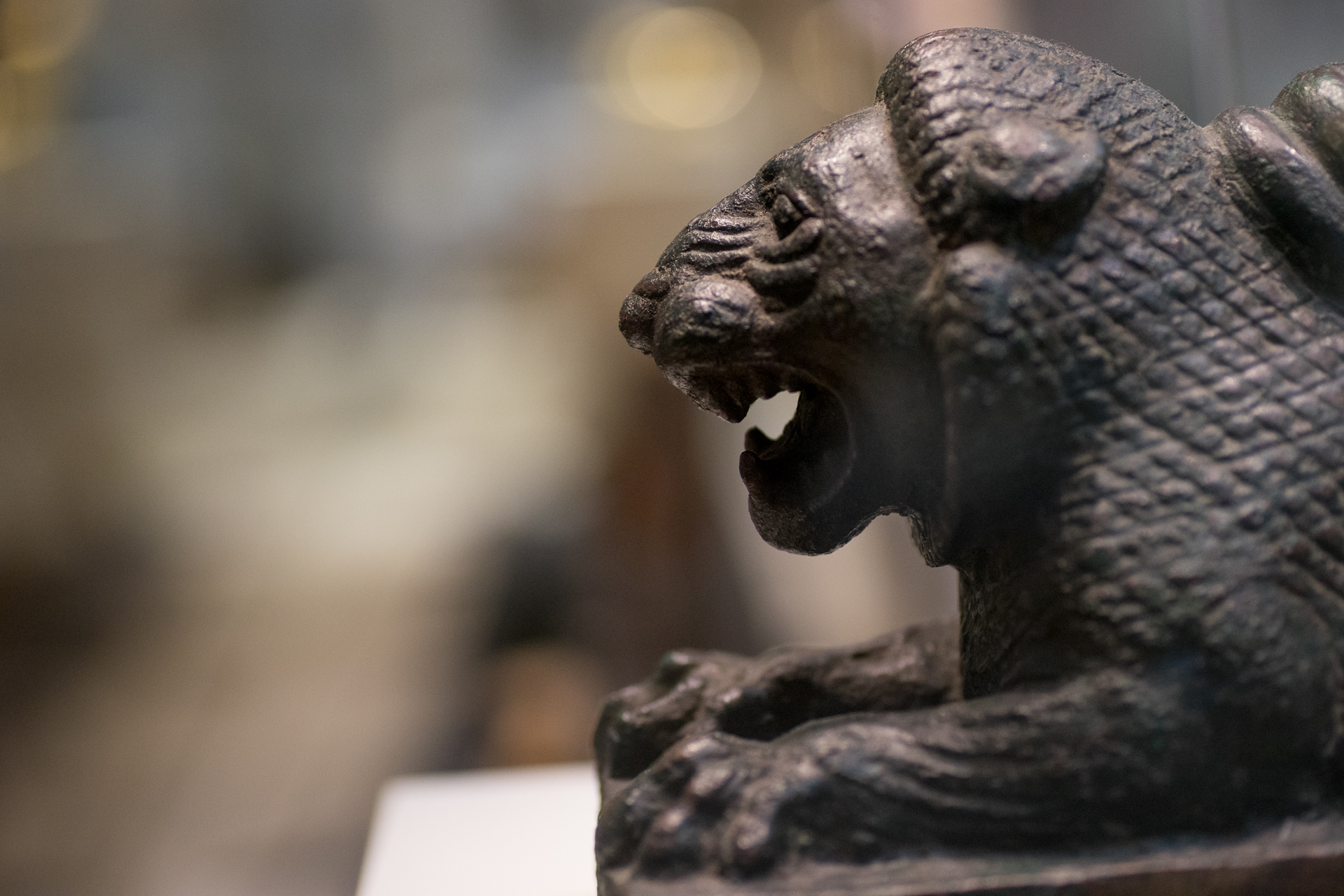
Close up

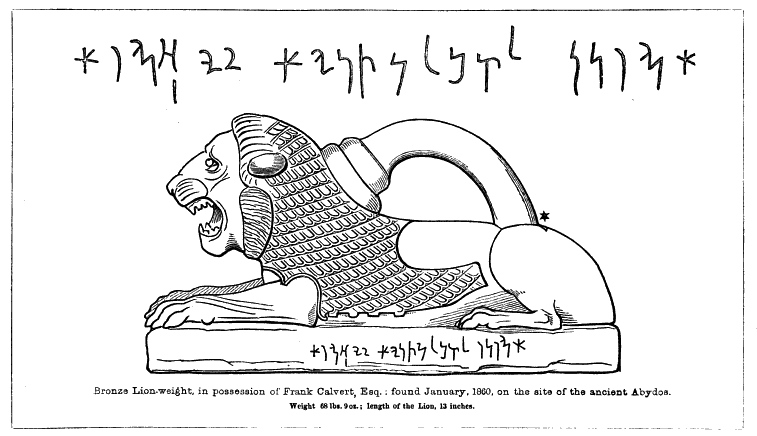
Calvert 1860 sketch

== Susa weight ==
A bronze lion weight discovered in 1901 at the Palace of Darius in Susa, dated to the 5th century BCE, is now in the Louvre with ID number Sb 2718. It is not inscribed.

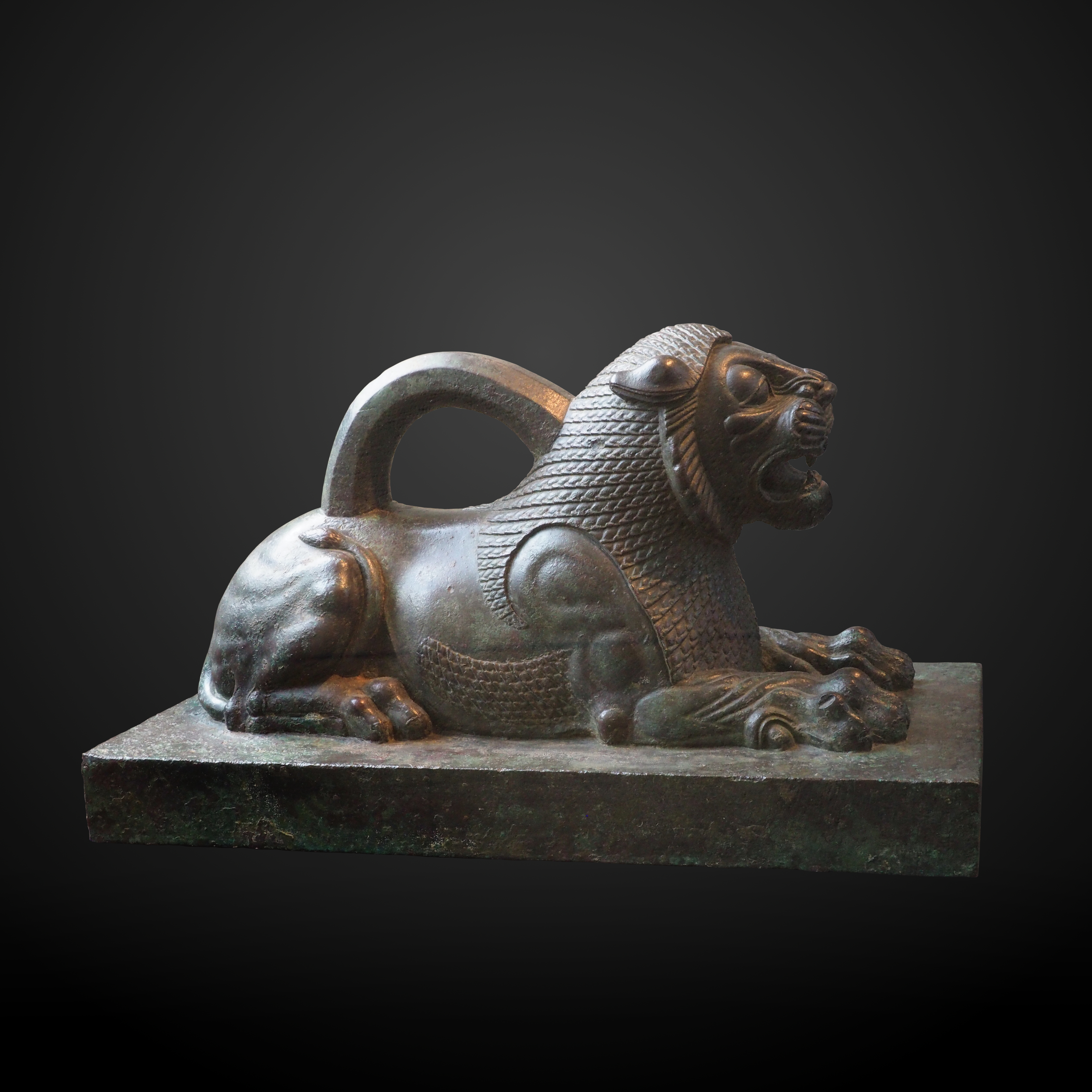
Bronze lion weight from the Palace of Darius in Susa, Louvre, 5th century BC

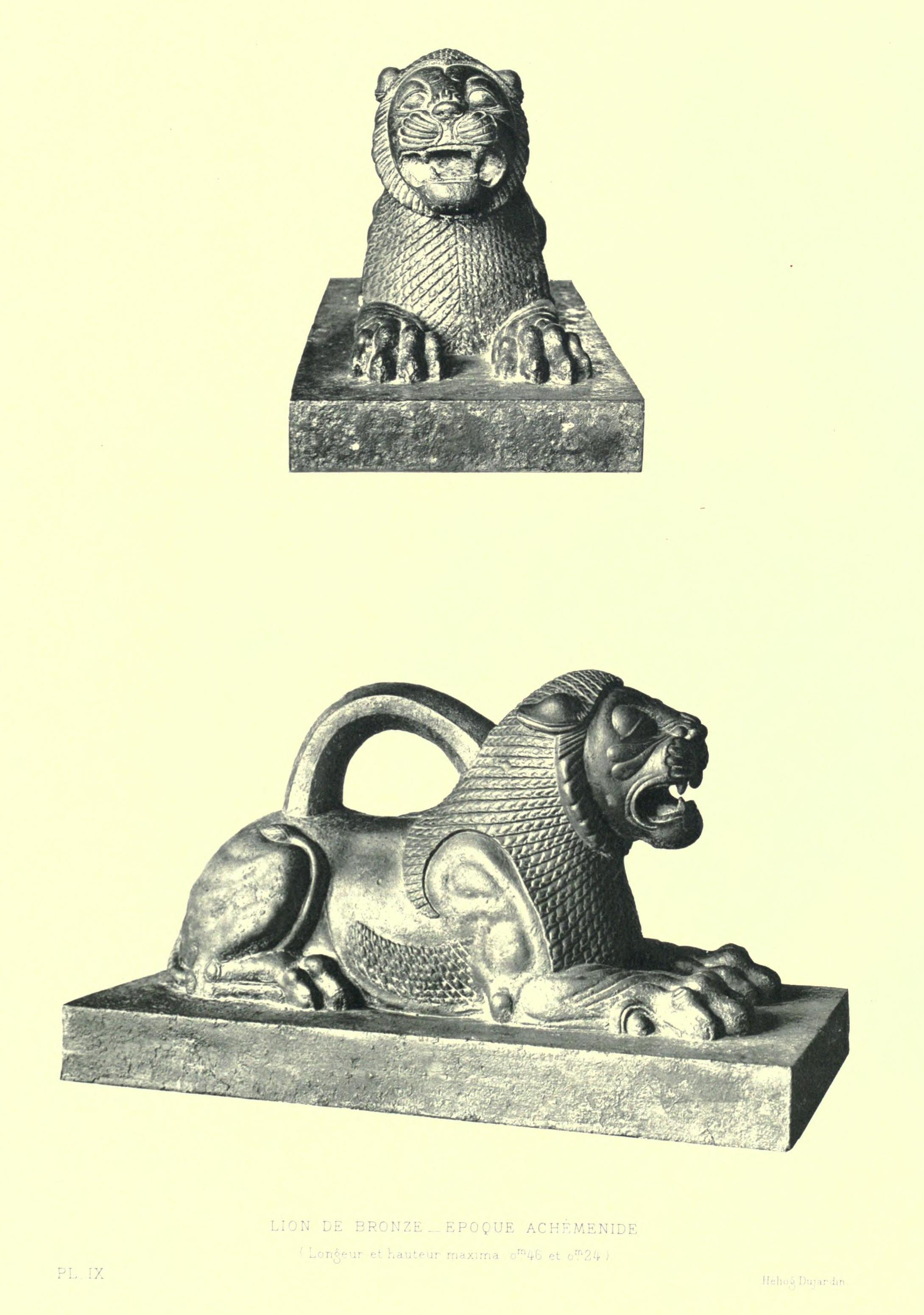
1905 photographs

== Khorsabad weight ==
A similar discovery was made by Paul-Émile Botta in the 1840s at Khorsabad. It is currently in the Louvre, under ID number AO 20116. It measures 29 cm high by 41 cm long, and is not inscribed.

Despite the significant similarities to the other lions, Botta considered it was part of a door system, not a weight. Botta wrote in his Monument De Ninive:

Celte petite statue, comme je l'ai déjà dit, a été trouvée scellée sur une dalle qui pavait l'enfoncement formé par la saillie du taureau et du massif du côté droit de la porte F. Il y en a eu de semblables nonseulement de l'autre côté de cette porte, mais encore à tontes les grandes entrées du monument, car on retrouve les dales sur lesquelles elles étaient fixées; mais celle-ci est la seule qui n'ait pas disparu, et rien ne prouve mieux avec quelle avidité on a, lors de la destruction des édifices, enlevé tout ce qui avait quelque valeur. Ce lion est représenté couché, les pattes antérieures en avant, sur une base carrée audessous de laquelle est une forte tige conique qui pénétrait dans un trou du pavé. La statue est massive, et fondue d'une seule pièce avec la plinthe et l'anneau qui s'élève au milieu du dos. Elle a quarante-deux centimètres de long.

(This small statue, as I have already said, was found sealed on a slab which paved the depression formed by the projection of the bull and the massif on the right side of door F. There were similar ones not only on the other side of this door, but also at all the large entrances of the monument, because we find the slabs on which they were fixed; but this one is the only one which has not disappeared, and nothing better proves with what avidity, during the destruction of the buildings, everything of any value was removed. This lion is represented lying down, its forelegs forward, on a square base below which is a strong conical rod which penetrated a hole in the pavement. The statue is massive, and cast in a single piece with the plinth and the ring which rises in the middle of the back. It is forty-two centimeters long.)

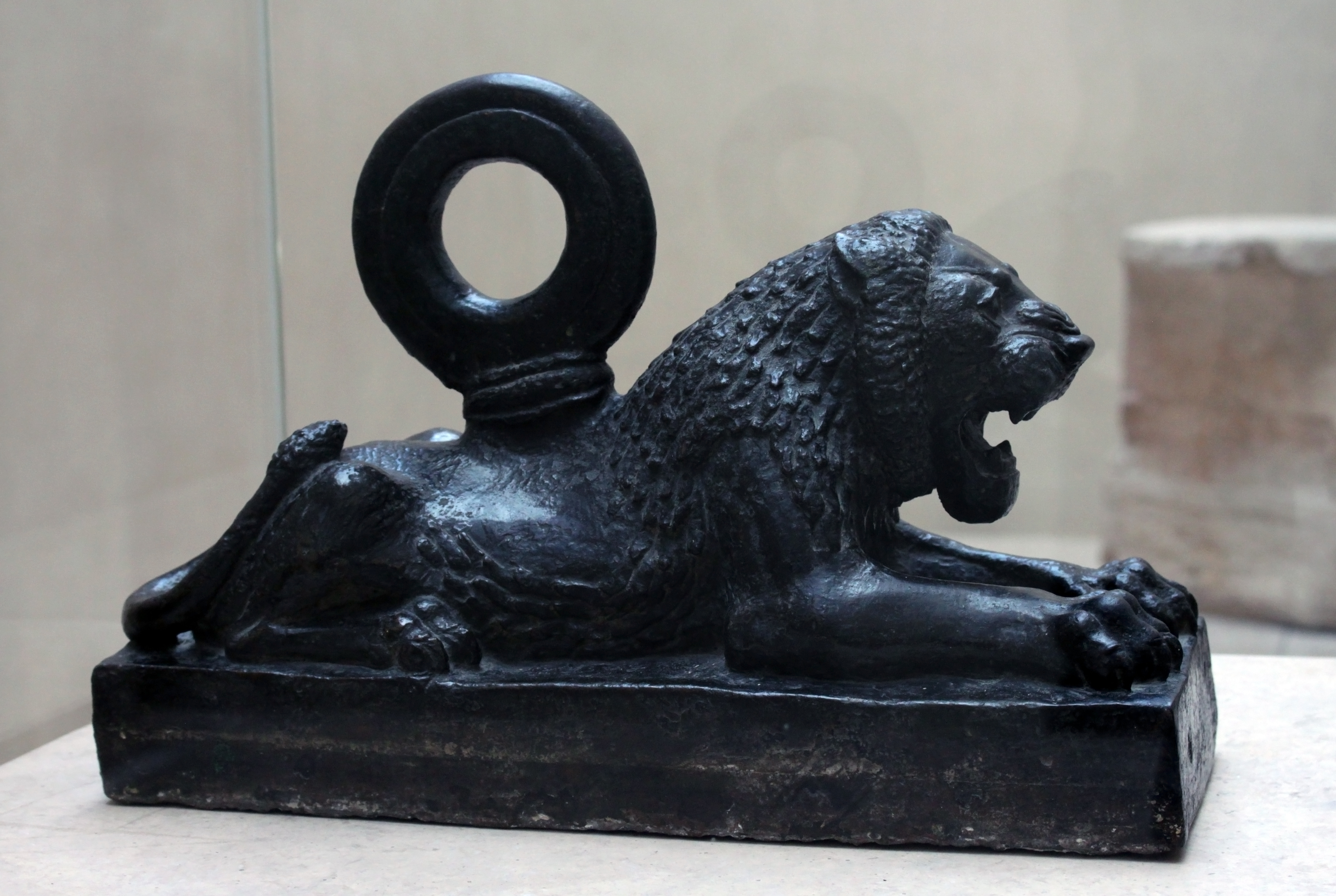
At the Louvre

At the Louvre

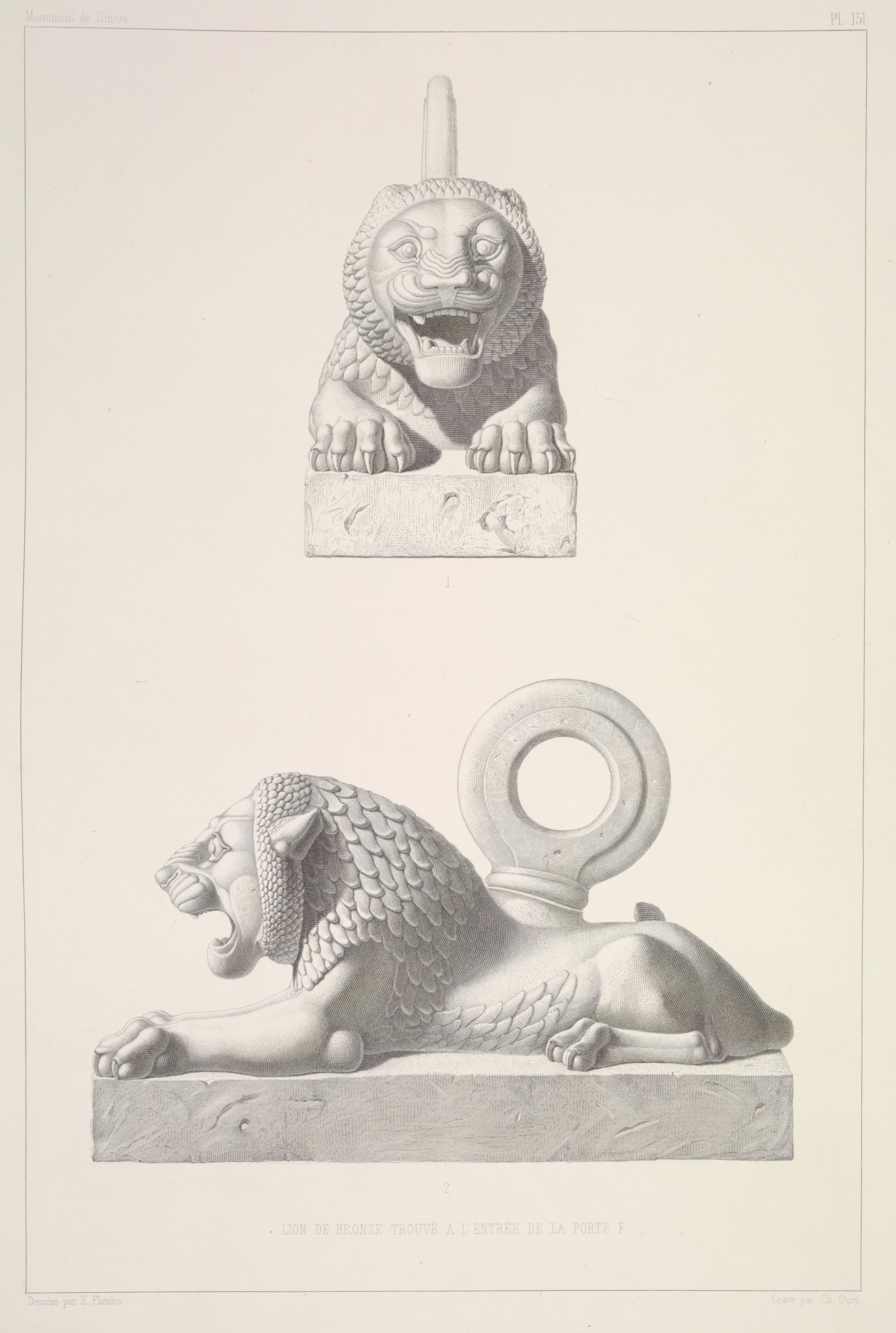
Botta 1850 sketch

== See also ==
- Assyrian lion
- Canaanite and Aramaic inscriptions

== Bibliography ==
- Edwin Norris (1856), On the Assyrian and Babylonian Weights, Journal of the Royal Asiatic Society of Great Britain and Ireland, Volume 16 (editio princeps)
- Frederic Madden (1864), History of Jewish coinage, and of money in the Old and New Testament, B. Quaritch
- Fales, Frederick Mario (1995), Assyro-Aramaica : the Assyrian lion-weights, in Immigration and Emigration within the Ancient Near East, pages 33–55; editor: Festschrift E. Lipinski, Peeters
- British Museum description
