= Ashur-danin-pal =

Son of Shalmaneser III

Assur-danin-pal (9th Century BC) was the son of the king of Assyria, Shalmaneser III. He rebelled against his father in an attempt to seize the throne. However, Shalmaneser III's younger son Shamshi-Adad V crushed his rebellion.

Assur-danin-pal had sought the alliance of the Babylonian King Marduk-balassu-iqbi, and tried to overthrow his brother. But Shamshi-Adad V undertook four campaigns and defeated the maurading army of the Babylonians.

Eventually, Assur-danin-pal had to give up his rebellion. His later years are shrouded in mystery.
