= Neo-Assyrian Empire =

Assyrian history (911–609 BCE)

Neo-Assyrian Empire 𒆳𒀭𒊹𒆠 (Note: Sign-by-sign transliterated as mat Aš-šurᴷᴵ, literally meaning "Country of Ashur". Equivalent in archaic Sumero-Akkadian cuneiforms: 𒆳𒀭𒊹𒆠 KUR AN-ŠAR₂ᴷᴵ; the same in Assyrian cuneiform in Ashubanipal's Rassam cylinder: 𒆳𒀭𒊹𒆠 KUR AN-ŠAR₂ᴷᴵ, pronounced in Assyrian mat Aušarᵏⁱ, then mat Aššurᵏⁱ mat Aššurᵏⁱ, meaning "The country of the city of god Aššur"; also phonetically in another inscription of Ashurbanipal 𒆳𒀸𒋩 mat aš-šur (Sumerian: 𒆳𒀸𒋩) or 𒀸𒋩𒆠 aš-šurᵏⁱ (Sumerian 𒀸𒋩𒆠) Also 𒆳𒀭𒀀𒋩 mat ᵈa-šur in Amarna letter EA 15 dating to c. 1340 BCE) māt Aššur
- 911 BCE–609 BCE
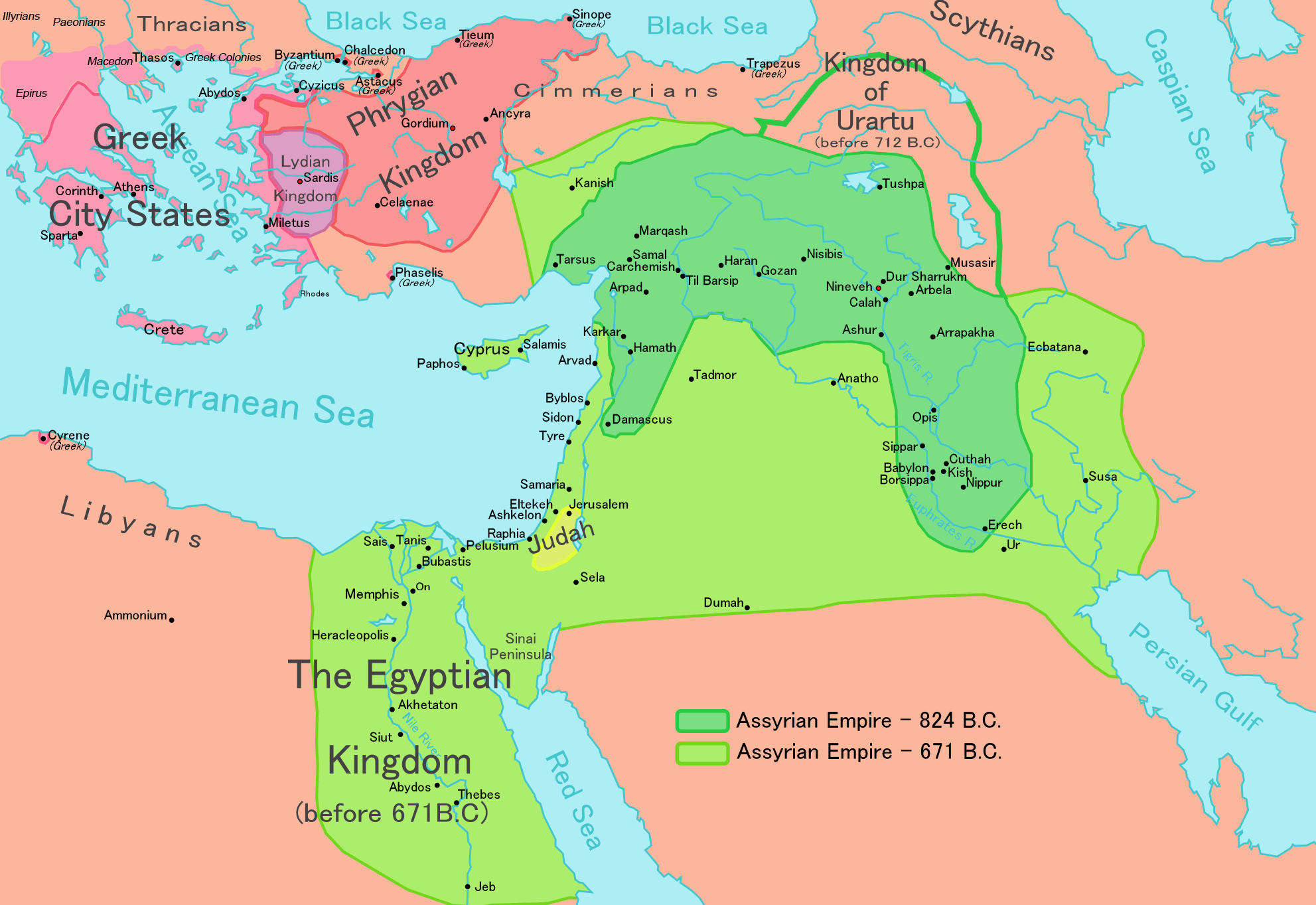
- The Neo-Assyrian Empire at its maximum extent, around 671 BCE.
- Capital: Assur (911–879 BCE); Nimrud (879–706 BCE); Dur-Sharrukin (706–705 BCE); Nineveh (705–612 BCE); Harran (612–609 BCE)
- Official languages: Akkadian; Imperial Aramaic
- Religion: Ancient Mesopotamian religion
- Government: Monarchy
- Notable kings
  - 911–891 BCE: Adad-nirari II (first)
  - 883–859 BCE: Ashurnasirpal II
  - 859–824 BCE: Shalmaneser III
  - 745–727 BCE: Tiglath-Pileser III
  - 722–705 BCE: Sargon II
  - 705–681 BCE: Sennacherib
  - 681–669 BCE: Esarhaddon
  - 669–631 BCE: Ashurbanipal
  - 612–609 BCE: Ashur-uballit II (last)
- Historical era: Iron Age
  - Accession of Adad-nirari II: 911 BCE
  - Nimrud made capital: 879 BCE
  - Age of the magnates: 823–745 BCE
  - Conquest of Babylonia: 729 BCE
  - Nineveh made capital: 705 BCE
  - Conquest of Egypt: 671 BCE
  - Medo-Babylonian conquest of the Assyrian Empire: 626–609 BCE
  - Fall of Assur: 614 BCE
  - Fall of Nineveh: 612 BCE
  - Fall of Harran: 609 BCE

Area
- 670 BCE: 1,400,000 km^{2} (540,000 sq mi)
Preceded by
Middle Assyrian Empire
Middle Babylonian period
Aram-Damascus
Kingdom of Israel (Samaria)
Mannaea
Twenty-fifth Dynasty of Egypt
Neo-Hittite states
Succeeded by
Neo-Babylonian Empire
Median Empire
Twenty-sixth Dynasty of Egypt

The Neo-Assyrian Empire (Note: Rarely also the Late Assyrian Empire or New Assyrian Empire) was the fourth and penultimate stage of ancient Assyrian history. Beginning with the accession of Adad-nirari II in 911 BCE, (Note: Adad-nirari II's accession is the conventional starting date for the Neo-Assyrian Empire. Some historians alternatively include the reign of his predecessor Ashur-dan II as well, placing the beginning of the Neo-Assyrian period in 934 BCE.) the Neo-Assyrian Empire grew to dominate the ancient Near East and parts of the South Caucasus, North Africa and the Eastern Mediterranean throughout much of the 9th to 7th centuries BCE, becoming the largest empire in history up to that point. Because of its geopolitical dominance and ideology based in world domination, the Neo-Assyrian Empire has been described as the first world empire in history. (Note: See the section the Neo-Assyrian Empire as a world empire) It influenced other empires of the ancient world culturally, administratively, and militarily, including the Neo-Babylonians, the Achaemenids, and the Seleucids. At its height, the empire was the strongest military power in the world and ruled over all of Mesopotamia, the Levant and Egypt, as well as parts of Anatolia, Arabia and what is now Iran and Armenia.

The early Neo-Assyrian kings were chiefly concerned with restoring Assyrian control over much of northern Mesopotamia, eastern Anatolia and Levant, since significant portions of the preceding Middle Assyrian Empire (1365–1050 BCE) had been lost during the late 11th century BCE. Under Ashurnasirpal II (r. 883–859 BCE), Assyria once more became the dominant power of the Near East, ruling the north undisputed. Ashurnasirpal's campaigns reached as far as the Mediterranean, and he oversaw the transfer of the imperial capital from the traditional city of Assur to the more centrally-located Kalḫu (later known as Calah in the Hebrew Bible, and Nimrud to the Arabs) The empire grew even more under Ashurnasirpal's successor Shalmaneser III (r. 859–824 BCE), though it entered a period of stagnation after his death, referred to as the "age of the magnates". During this time, the chief wielders of political power were prominent generals and officials, and central control was unusually weak. This age came to an end with the rule of Tiglath-Pileser III (r. 745–727 BCE), who reasserted Assyrian royal power and more than doubled the size of the empire through wide-ranging conquests. His most notable conquests were Babylonia in the south and large parts of the Levant. Under the Sargonid dynasty, which ruled from 722 BCE to the fall of the empire, Assyria reached its apex. Under Sennacherib (r. 705–681 BCE), the capital was transferred to Nineveh, and under Esarhaddon (r. 681–669 BCE) the empire reached its largest extent through the conquest of Egypt. Despite being at the peak of its power, the empire experienced a swift and violent fall in the late 7th century BCE, destroyed by a Babylonian uprising and an invasion by the Medes. The causes behind how Assyria could be destroyed so quickly continue to be debated among scholars.

The unprecedented success of the Neo-Assyrian Empire was not only due to its ability to expand but also, and perhaps more importantly, its ability to efficiently incorporate conquered lands into its administrative system. As the first of its scale, the empire saw various military, civic and administrative innovations. In the military, important innovations included the large-scale use of cavalry and new siege warfare techniques. Techniques first adopted by the Neo-Assyrian army would be used in later warfare for millennia. To solve the issue of communicating over vast distances, the empire developed a sophisticated state communication system, using relay stations and well-maintained roads. The communication speed of official messages in the empire was not surpassed in the Middle East until the 19th century. The empire also made use of a resettlement policy, wherein some portions of the populations from conquered lands were resettled in the Assyrian heartland and in underdeveloped provinces. This policy served to both disintegrate local identities and to introduce Assyrian-developed agricultural techniques to all parts of the empire. A consequence was the dilution of the cultural diversity of the Near East, forever changing the ethnolinguistic composition of the region and facilitating the rise of Aramaic as the regional lingua franca, a position the language retained until the 14th century.

The Neo-Assyrian Empire left a legacy of great cultural significance. The political structures established by the empire became the model for later empires, and the ideology of universal rule promulgated by the Neo-Assyrian kings inspired—through the concept of translatio imperii—similar ideas of rights to world domination as late as the early modern period. The empire became an important part of later folklore and literary traditions in northern Mesopotamia through the subsequent post-imperial period and beyond. Judaism—and in turn Christianity and Islam—was profoundly affected by the period of Neo-Assyrian rule; numerous Biblical stories appear to draw on earlier Assyrian mythology and history, and the Assyrian impact on early Jewish theology was immense. (Note: It has for instance been suggested that Hebrew monotheism, which developed around this time, followed experiences with the near-monotheism of the Assyrians in regard to Ashur or the monocratic imperial rule of the Neo-Assyrian kings.) Although the empire is prominently remembered today for the supposed excessive brutality of its army, the Assyrians were not excessively brutal when compared to other civilizations throughout history.

== Background ==
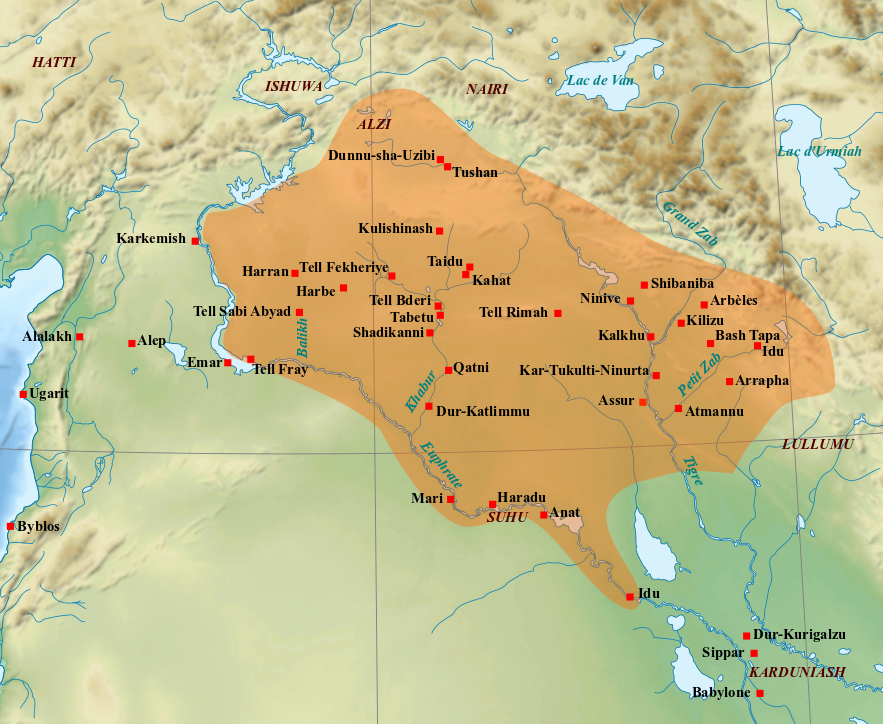
Approximate map of the preceding Middle Assyrian Empire at its height in the 13th century BCE

Imperialism and the ambition of establishing a universal, all-encompassing empire was a long-established aspect of royal ideology in the ancient Near East prior to the rise of the Neo-Assyrian Empire. In the Early Dynastic Period of Mesopotamia (c. 2900 – c. 2350 BCE), the Sumerian rulers of the various city-states in the region often fought with each other in order to establish small hegemonic empires and to gain a superior position relative to the other city-states. Eventually, these small conflicts evolved into a general ambition to achieve universal rule. Reaching a position of world domination was not seen as a wholly impossible task in this time since Mesopotamia was believed to correspond to the entire world. One of the earliest Mesopotamian "world conquerors" was Lugalzaggesi, king of Uruk, who conquered all of Lower Mesopotamia in the 24th century BCE. The succeeding Akkadian Empire is generally regarded as the first known empire.

Numerous imperialist states rose and fell in Mesopotamia and the rest of the Near East after the time of the Akkadian Empire. Most early empires and kingdoms were limited to some core territories, with most of their subjects only nominally recognizing the authority of the central government. Still, the general desire for universal rule dominated the royal ideologies of Mesopotamian kings for thousands of years, bolstered by the memory of the Akkadian Empire and exemplified in titles such as "king of the Universe" or "king of the Four Corners of the World". This desire was also manifested in the kings of Assyria, who ruled in what had been the northern part of the Akkadian Empire. Assyria experienced its first period of ascendancy with the rise of the Middle Assyrian Empire in the 14th century BCE, previously only having been a city-state centered around the city of Assur. From the time of Adad-nirari I (r. c. 1305–1274 BCE) onwards, Assyria became one of the great powers of the ancient Near East. Under Tukulti-Ninurta I (r. c. 1243–1207 BCE) the empire reached its greatest extent and became the dominant force in Mesopotamia, for a time even subjugating Babylonia in the south. After Tukulti-Ninurta's assassination, the Middle Assyrian Empire went into a long period of decline, becoming increasingly restricted to just the Assyrian heartland. Though this period of decline was broken up by Tiglath-Pileser I (r. 1114–1076 BCE), who once more expanded Assyrian power, his conquests overstretched Assyria and could not be maintained by his successors. The trend of decline was substantially reversed in the reign of the last Middle Assyrian king, Ashur-dan II (r. 934–912 BCE) who campaigned in the northeast and northwest.

== History ==
=== Resurgence of Assyrian power ===
==== Initial reconquest ====
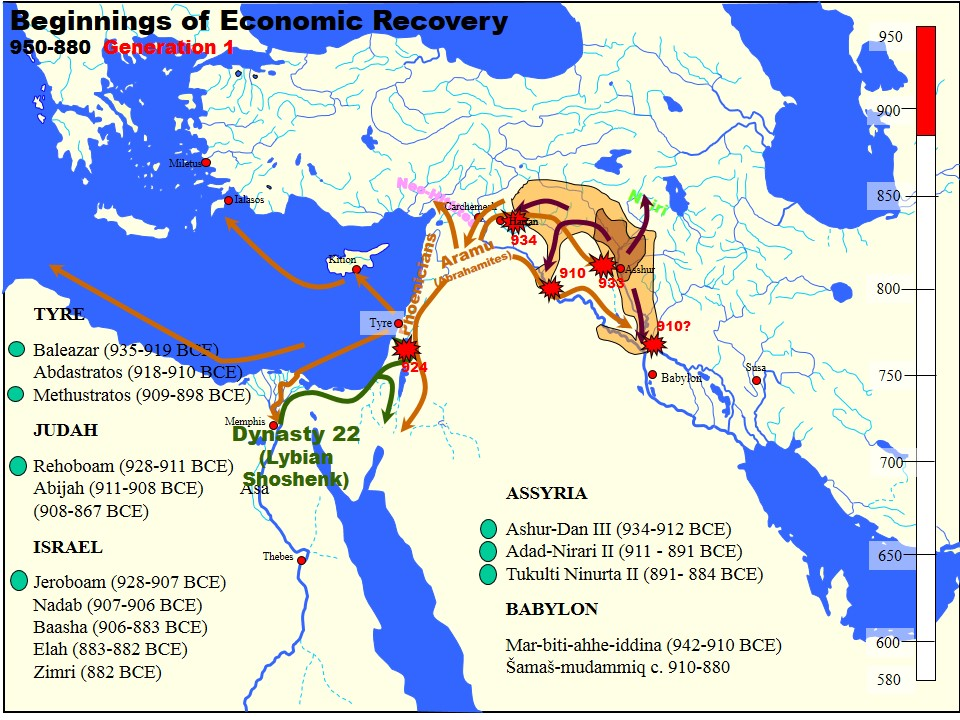
Early Neo-Assyrian borders and campaigns under Ashur-dan II (r. 934–912 BCEE), Adad-nirari II (r. 911–891 BCEE) and Tukulti-Ninurta II (r. 890–884 BCEE)

The early Neo-Assyrian kings initially set out to reverse the long decline of Assyria, retake its former lands, and reestablish the position it held at the height of its power. These two empires were not as distinct as their portrayal sometimes suggests, with Neo-Assyrian rulers part of the same continuous dynasty as their earlier counterparts. The outward reexpansion by these new kings was cast as war to liberate those Assyrians cut off from Assyrian territory and forced to live under foreign rulers. This held at least some truth, with material evidence from sites lost and then reconquered by the empire demonstrating an endurance of Assyrian culture in the interim. Early efforts at reconquest were mostly focused on the region up to the Khabur in the west.

One of the first conquests of Ashur-dan II had been Katmuḫu in this region, which he made a vassal state rather than annexing it outright; this suggests that the resources available to the early Neo-Assyrian rulers were very limited and that the imperial reconquest had to begin nearly from scratch. In this context, the successful expansion conducted under early rulers was an extraordinary achievement. The initial phase of the Assyrian reconquista was slow, beginning under Ashur-dan II near the end of the Middle Assyrian period and covering the reigns of the first two Neo-Assyrian rulers, Adad-nirari II (r. 911–891 BCE) and Tukulti-Ninurta II (r. 890–884 BCE). Ashur-dan's efforts mostly worked to pave the way for the more sustained work under Adad-nirari and Tukulti-Ninurta.

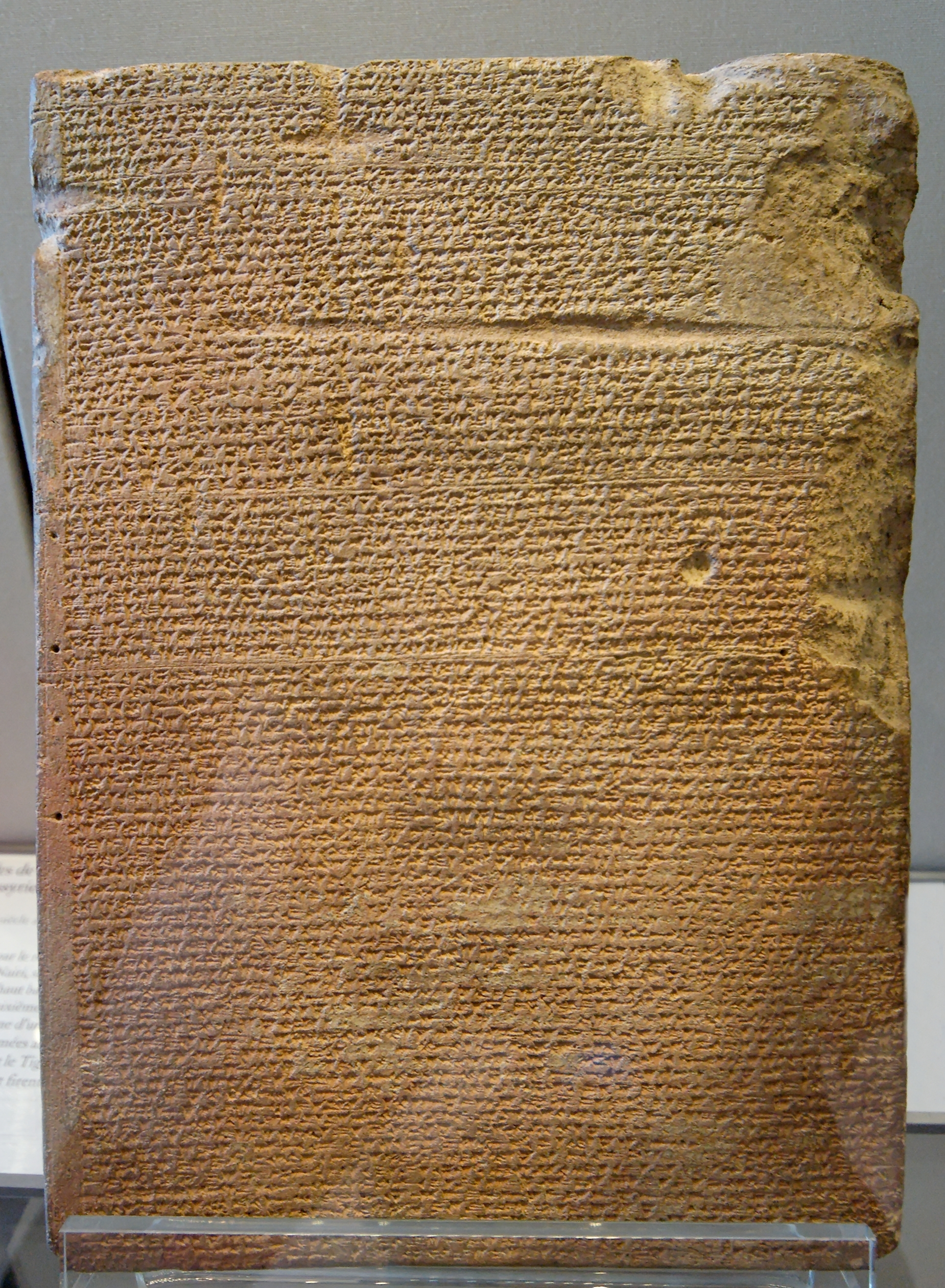
Annals of Tukulti-Ninurta II (r. 890–884 BCEE), recounting one of his campaigns

Among the conquests of Adad-nirari, the most strategically important campaigns were the wars directed to the southeast, beyond the Little Zab. These lands had previously been under Babylonian rule. One of Adad-nirari's wars brought the Neo-Assyrian army as far south as Der, close to the border of the southwestern kingdom of Elam. Though Adad-nirari did not manage to incorporate territories so far from the Assyrian heartland into the empire, he secured Arrapḫa (now Kirkuk), which later served as the launching point for numerous Assyrian campaigns into eastern lands. Adad-nirari managed to secure a border agreement with the Babylonian king Nabu-shuma-ukin I, sealed by both kings marrying the other's daughter. Adad-nirari continued Ashur-dan's efforts in the west; in his wars, he defeated numerous small western kingdoms. Several small states, such as Guzana, were made vassals, and others, such as Nisibis, were placed under pro-Assyrian puppet kings. After his successful wars in the region, Adad-nirari was able to undertake a long march along the Khabur and the Euphrates, collecting tribute from all the local rulers without military opposition. He also conducted important building projects; Apku, located between Nineveh and Sinjar and destroyed c. 1000 BCE, was rebuilt and became an important administrative center.

Though he reigned only briefly, Adad-nirari's son, Tukulti-Ninurta, continued his father's policies. In 885 BCE, Tukulti-Ninurta repeated his father's march along the Euphrates and Khabur, though he went in the opposite direction, beginning in the south at Dur-Kurigalzu and then collecting tribute while he travelled north. Some of the southern cities that sent tribute to Tukulti-Ninurta during this march were historically more closely aligned with Babylon. Tukulti-Ninurta fought small states in the east to strengthen Assyrian control in that direction. Among the lands he defeated were Kirruri, Ḫubuškia and Gilzan. In later times, Gilzan often supplied Assyria with horses.

==== Dominion over the Near East ====
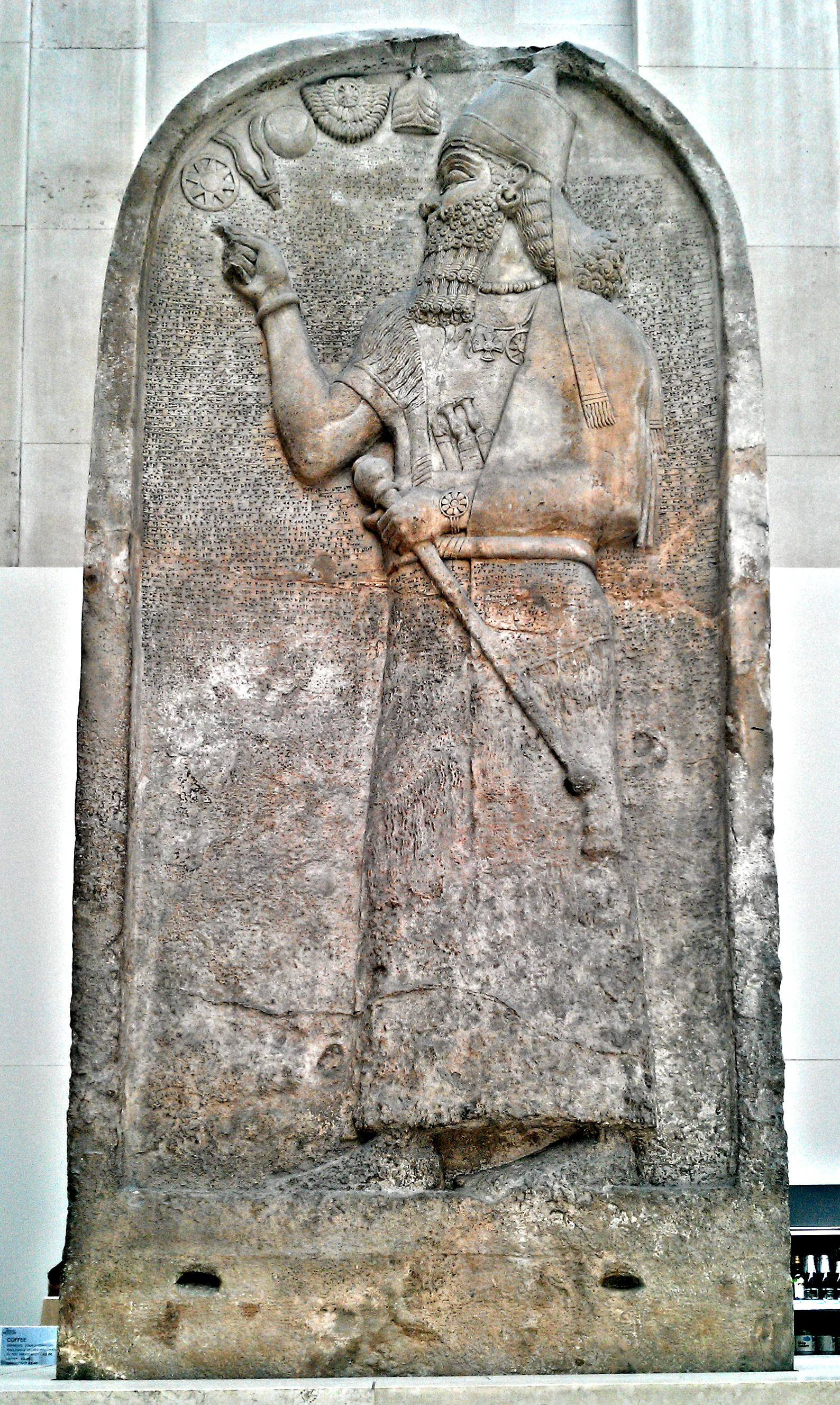
Stele of Ashurnasirpal II (r. 883–859 BCE)

The second phase of the reconquista was initiated in the reign of Tukulti-Ninurta's son and successor Ashurnasirpal II (r. 883–859 BCE). Under his rule, Assyria rose to become the dominant political power in the Near East. In terms of personality, Ashurnasirpal was a complex figure; he was a relentless warrior and one of the most brutal kings in Assyrian history, (Note: Ashurnasirpal II is one of only four Assyrian kings who claimed to have slaughtered civilians in his inscriptions and the only one to claim to have killed and burnt young children. In terms of the variety and severity of brutal acts, he is rivalled only by the later Ashurbanipal.) but he also cared about the people, working to increase the prosperity and comfort of his subjects, establishing extensive water reserves and food depots in times of crisis. As a result of the successful campaigns of his predecessors, Ashurnasirpal inherited an impressive amount of resources with which he could work to re-establish Assyrian dominance. Ashurnasirpal's first campaign in 883 BCE was against the revolting cities of Suru and Tela along the northern portion of the Tigris river. At Tela he brutally repressed the citizens, among other punishments cutting off noses, ears, fingers and limbs, gouging out eyes and overseeing impalements and decapitations.

Ashurnasirpal's later campaigns included three wars against the kingdom of Zamua in the eastern Zagros Mountains, repeated campaigns against Nairi and Urartu in the north, and, most prominently, near continuous conflict with Aramean and Neo-Hittite kingdoms in the west. The Arameans and Neo-Hittites had evolved into well-organized kingdoms, possibly in response to pressure from Assyria. One of Ashurnasirpal's most persistent enemies was the Aramean king Ahuni, who ruled Bit Adini. Ahuni's forces broke through across the Khabur and Euphrates several times, and it was only after years of war that he at last accepted Ashurnasirpal as his suzerain. Ahuni's defeat was highly important as it marked the first time since Ashur-bel-kala two centuries prior that Assyrian forces campaigned further west than the Euphrates. Ashurnasirpal made use of this opportunity. In his ninth campaign, he marched to Lebanon and then to the Mediterranean coast. Though few of them became formally incorporated into the empire at this point, many kingdoms on the way paid tribute to Ashurnasirpal to avoid being attacked, including Carchemish and Patina, as well as Phoenician cities such as Sidon, Byblos, Tyre and Arwad. Ashurnasirpal's royal inscriptions proudly proclaim that he and his army symbolically cleaned their weapons in the water of the Mediterranean.

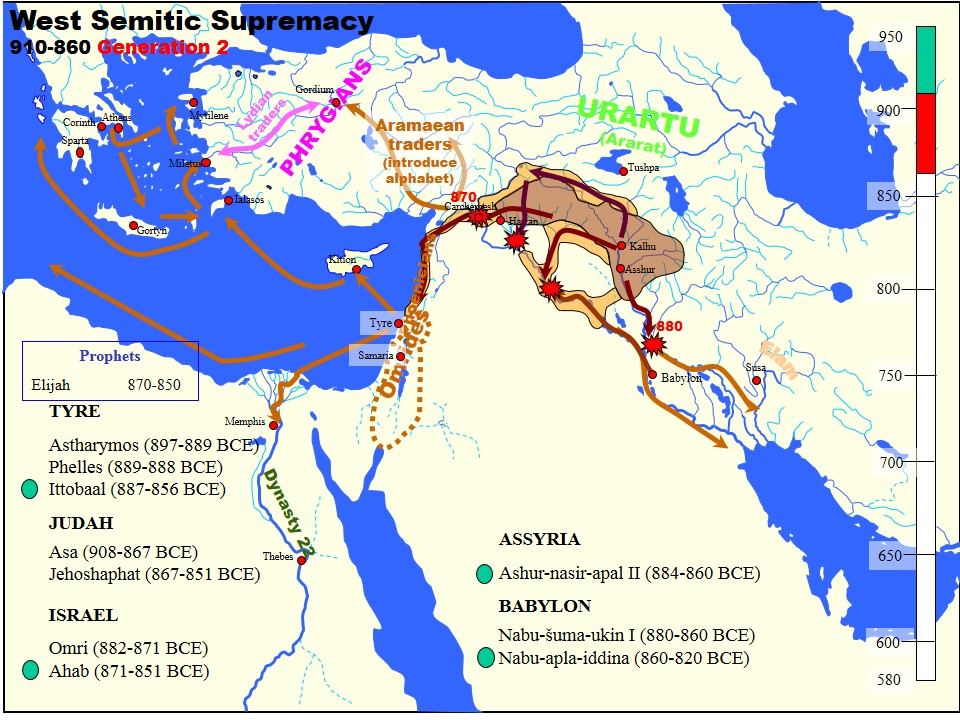
Assyrian borders and campaigns under Ashurnasirpal II (r. 883–859 BCE)

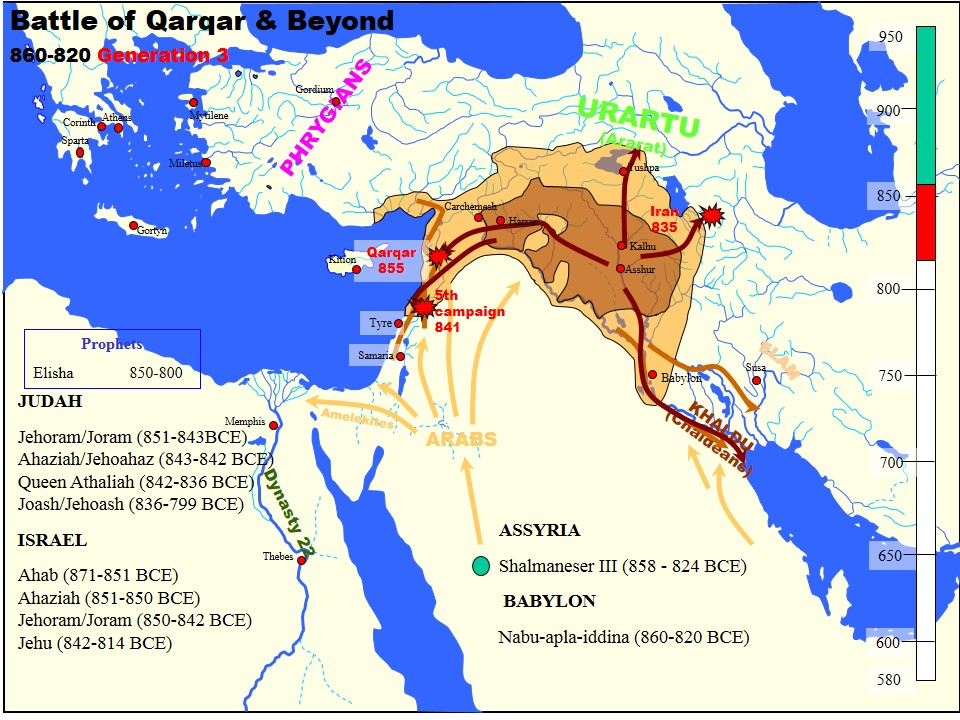
Assyrian borders and campaigns under Shalmaneser III (r. 859–824 BCE)

Ashurnasirpal financed several large-scale building projects at cities like Assur, Nineveh and Balawat. The most impressive and important project conducted was the restoration of the ruined town of Nimrud, located on the eastern bank of the Tigris in the Assyrian heartland. In 879 BCE, Ashurnasirpal made Nimrud the capital of the empire and employed thousands of workers to construct fortifications, palaces and temples in the city. Assur became a ceremonial city, although it was still the empire's religious center.

Ashurnasirpal's aggressive military politics were continued under his son Shalmaneser III (r. 859–824 BCEE), whose reign saw a considerable expansion of Assyrian territory. The lands along the Khabur and Euphrates rivers in the west were consolidated under Assyrian control. Ahuni of Bit Adini resisted for several years, but he surrendered to Shalmaneser in the winter of 857/856 BCE. When Shalmaneser visited the city in the summer of the next year, he renamed it Kar-Salmanu‐ašared ("fortress of Shalmaneser"), settled a substantial number of Assyrians there, and made it the administrative center of a new province, placed under the turtanu (commander in chief). Shalmaneser also placed other powerful officials, so-called "magnates", in charge of other vulnerable provinces and regions of the empire.

The most powerful and threatening enemy of Assyria at this point was Urartu in the north; the Urartian administration, culture, writing system, and religion closely followed those of Assyria. The Urartian kings were autocrats similar to the Assyrian kings. The Assyrians also took some inspiration from Urartu. For instance, Assyrian irrigation technology and cavalry units, introduced by Shalmaneser, may have been derived from encounters with Urartu. The imperialist expansion undertaken by the kings of both Urartu and Assyria led to frequent military clashes between the two, despite their separation by the Taurus Mountains. In 856 BCE, Shalmaneser conducted an ambitious military campaign, marching through mountainous territory to the source of the Euphrates and then attacking Urartu from the west. King Arame was forced to flee as Shalmaneser's forces sacked the Urartian capital of Arzashkun, devastated the Urartian heartland, and then marched into what today is western Iran before returning to Arbela in Assyria.

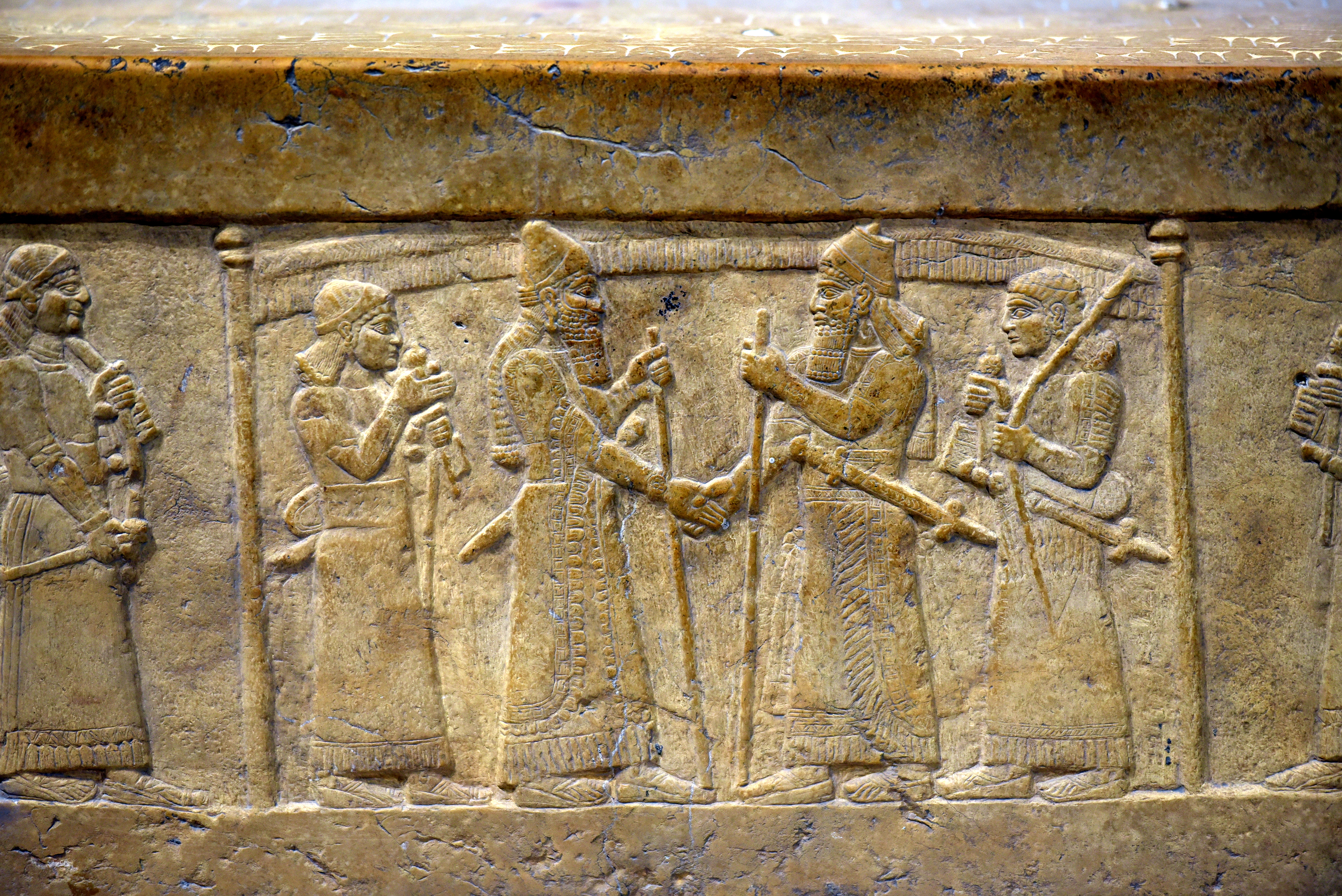
Depiction of Shalmaneser III (right) shaking hands with the Babylonian king Marduk-zakir-shumi I (left)

Although Shalmaneser's campaign against Urartu compelled many small states in northern Syria to pay tribute, he was unable to fully exploit the situation. In 853 BCE, a coalition of western states assembled at Tell Qarqur in Syria against Assyrian expansion. The coalition included numerous kings of various peoples, including the earliest historically verifiable Israelite and Arab rulers, and was led by King Hadadezer of Aram-Damascus. Shalmaneser engaged the coalition in the same year that it was formed. Although Assyrian records claim he won a great victory at the Battle of Qarqar, it is more likely the battle was indecisive, as no substantial political or territorial gains were achieved. After Qarqar, Shalmaneser focused much on the south and in 851–850 BCE, aided the Babylonian king Marduk-zakir-shumi I to defeat a revolt by his brother Marduk-bel-ushati. After defeating the rebel, Shalmaneser spent some time visiting cities in Babylon and further aiding Marduk-zakir-shumi in fighting the Chaldeans in the far south of Mesopotamia. As Babylonian culture was greatly appreciated in Assyria, Shalmaneser was proud of his alliance with the Babylonian king; a surviving work of art depicts the two rulers shaking hands. In the 840s and 830s BCE, Shalmaneser again campaigned in Syria and succeeded in receiving tribute from numerous western states after the coalition against him collapsed with Hadadezer's death in 841 BCE. Assyrian forces thrice tried to capture Damascus but were unsuccessful. Shalmaneser's failed attempts to impose Assyrian rule in Syria resulted from his energetic campaigns, which overextended the empire too quickly. In the 830s BCE, his armies reached into Cilicia in Anatolia, and in 836 BCE, Shalmaneser reached Ḫubušna (near what is now Ereğli, Konya), one of the westernmost places reached by Assyrian forces. Though Shalmaneser's conquests were wide-ranging and inspired fear among the other kings of the Near East, he lacked the means to stabilize and consolidate his new lands, and imperial control in many places remained shaky.

=== Age of the magnates ===
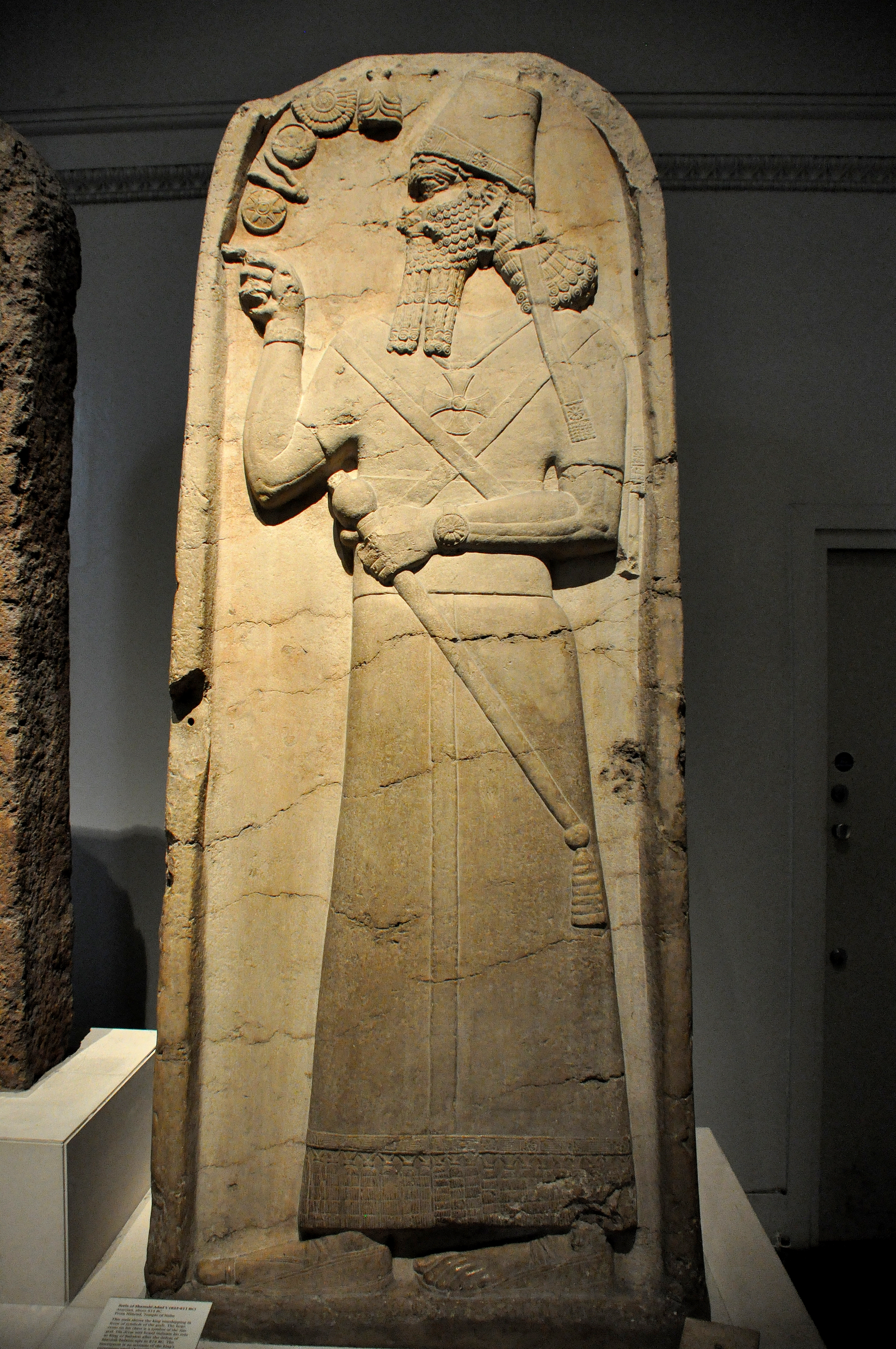
Stele of Shamshi-Adad V (r. 824–811 BCE)

In the latter years of Shalmaneser's reign, Urartu rose again as a powerful adversary. Though the Assyrians campaigned against them in 830 BCE, they failed to fully neutralize the threat posed by the restored kingdom. The 830 BCE campaign against Urartu was not led by Shalmaneser but by the long-serving and prominent turtanu Dayyan-Assur. Dayyan-Assur led other campaigns on behalf of the kings. Shalmaneser's final years became preoccupied by an internal crisis when one of his sons, Ashur-danin-pal, rebelled in an attempt to seize the throne, possibly because the younger son Shamshi-Adad V had been designated as heir instead of him. When Shalmaneser died in 824 BCE, Ashur-danin-pal was still in revolt, supported by a significant portion of the country, including Assur. Shamshi-Adad was perhaps initially a minor and a puppet of Dayyan-Assur. Though Dayyan-Assur died during the early stages of the civil war, Shamshi-Adad was eventually victorious, apparently with help from Marduk-zakir-shumi or his successor Marduk-balassu-iqbi.

Shamshi-Adad's accession marked the beginning of a new age of Neo-Assyrian history, sometimes dubbed the "age of the magnates". This time was marked by the number of royal inscriptions being much smaller than in preceding and succeeding times, and Assyrian magnates—such as Dayyan-Assur and other prominent generals and officials—being the dominant political actors, with the kings wielding significantly less power and influence. Though the consequences of this shift in power remain debated, the age of the magnates has often been characterized as a period of decline. Assyria endured through this period largely unscathed, but there was little to no territorial expansion and central power grew unusually weak. Some developments were good for the longevity of the empire, since many magnates took the opportunity to develop stronger military and economic structures and institutions in their own lands throughout the empire. Shamshi-Adad's earliest campaigns were against a series of Urartian fortresses and western Iran and quite limited in scope. Most of Shamshi-Adad's early reign was relatively unsuccessful; his third campaign against the small states in the Zagros Mountains region may have ended in an Assyrian defeat, and many of the small kingdoms in northern Syria ceased paying tribute. In 817 or 816 BCE, there was a rebellion against the king at Tillê, within the Assyrian heartland.

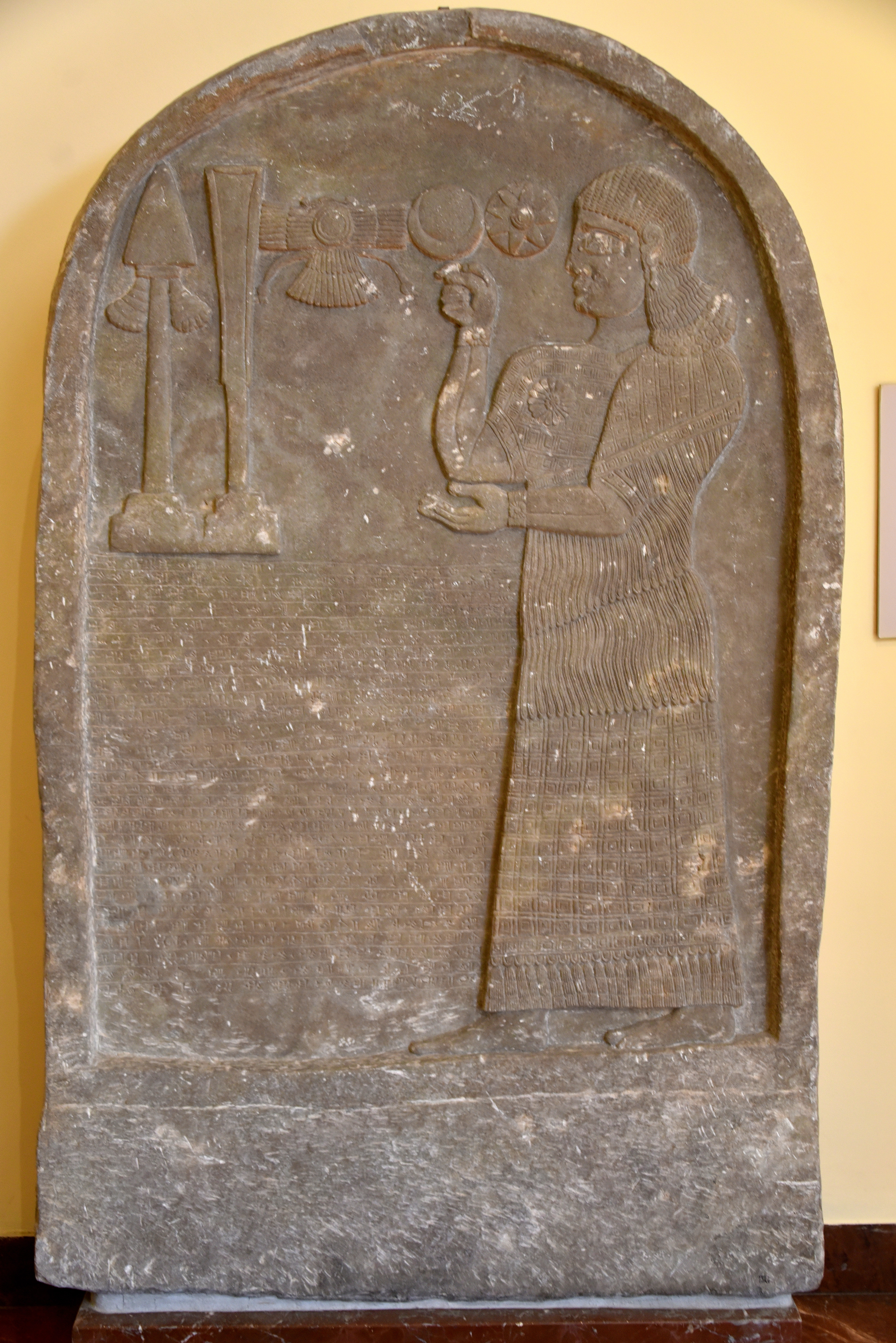
Stele of Bel-harran-beli-usur, a palace herald, made in the reign of Shalmaneser IV (r. 783–773 BCEE)

From 815 BCE, Shamshi-Adad directed his efforts mainly against Marduk-balassu-iqbi. In 813 BCE, he defeated Marduk-balassu-iqbi and brought him to Assyria as a captive. A year later, he defeated the Babylonian successor Baba-aha-iddina and annexed several territories in northern Babylonia. Southern Mesopotamia was left in disarray after Shamshi-Adad's victories. Though Babylonia nominally came under Assyrian control, Shamshi-Adad took the ancient Babylonian title "king of Sumer and Akkad" but not the conventional "king of Babylon". Due to Assyria's perhaps somewhat weakened state he was unable to fully exploit the victory, and the Babylonian throne remained unoccupied for several years.

Shamshi-Adad's son Adad-nirari III (r. 811–783 BCE) was probably very young at the time of his father's death in 811 BCE, and real political power during his early reign was probably wielded by the turtanu Nergal‐ila'i and by Adad-nirari's mother Shammuramat. Shammuramat was one of the most powerful women in Assyrian history and perhaps for a time served as co-regent; she is recorded to have partaken in a military campaign, the only ancient Assyriain woman known to have done so, against Kummuh in Syria and is credited in inscriptions alongside her son for expanding Assyrian territory, usually only a royal privilege. After Shammuramat's death, Adad-nirari continued to be dominated by other figures, such as the eunuch Nergal-eresh. Despite his limited sole authority, Adad-nirari's reign saw some military successes, and Assyrian armies campaigned in western Iran at least 13 times. The western territories, now more or less autonomous, were only attacked four times, though Adad-nirari managed to defeat Aram-Damascus. In 790 BCE, Adad-nirari conducted the first Assyrian campaign against the Aramaic tribes living in the Assyro-Babylonian border regions. In c. 787 BCE Adad-nirari appointed the new turtanu Shamshi-ilu. Shamshi-ilu would occupy this position for about 40 years and was for most of that time likely the most powerful political actor in Assyria.

After Adad-nirari's death in 783 BCE, three of his sons ruled in succession: Shalmaneser IV (r. 783–773 BCE), Ashur-dan III (r. 773–755 BCE) and Ashur-nirari V (r. 755–745 BCE). Their reigns collectively appear to mark the low point of Assyrian royal power, as only a remarkably small number of royal inscriptions are known from them. In Shalmaneser IV's reign, Shamshi-ilu eventually grew bold enough to stop crediting the king at all in his inscriptions and instead claimed to act completely on his own, more openly flaunting his power. Probably under Shamshi-ilu's leadership, the Assyrian army began to mainly focus on Urartu. In 774 BCE, Shamshi-ilu scored an important victory against Argishti I of Urartu, though Urartu was not decisively beaten. There was however some significant successes in the west since Shamshi-ilu captured Damascus in 773 BCE and secured tribute from the city to the king. Another official who acted with usually royal privileges in Shalmaneser's time was the palace herald Bel-harran-beli-usur, who founded a city, Dur-Bel-harran-beli-usur (named after himself), and claimed in a stele that it was he, and not the king, who had established tax exemptions for the city. Though little information survives concerning Ashur-dan III's reign, it is clear that it was particularly difficult. Much of his reign was spent putting down revolts. These revolts were perhaps the result of the plague epidemics sweeping Assyria and the Assyrian eclipse of 15 June 763 BCE; both the epidemics and the eclipse could have been interpreted by the Assyrian populace as the gods withdrawing their divine support for Ashur-dan's rule. Though Assyria stabilized again under Ashur-nirari V, he appears to have been relatively idle. Ashur-nirari campaigned in only three of the ten years of his reign and is not recorded to have conducted any construction projects. Though the Assyrian army under Ashur-nirari was successful against Arpad in northwestern Syria in 754 BCE, they were also beaten at an important battle against Sarduri II of Urartu.

=== Revitalization and rise ===
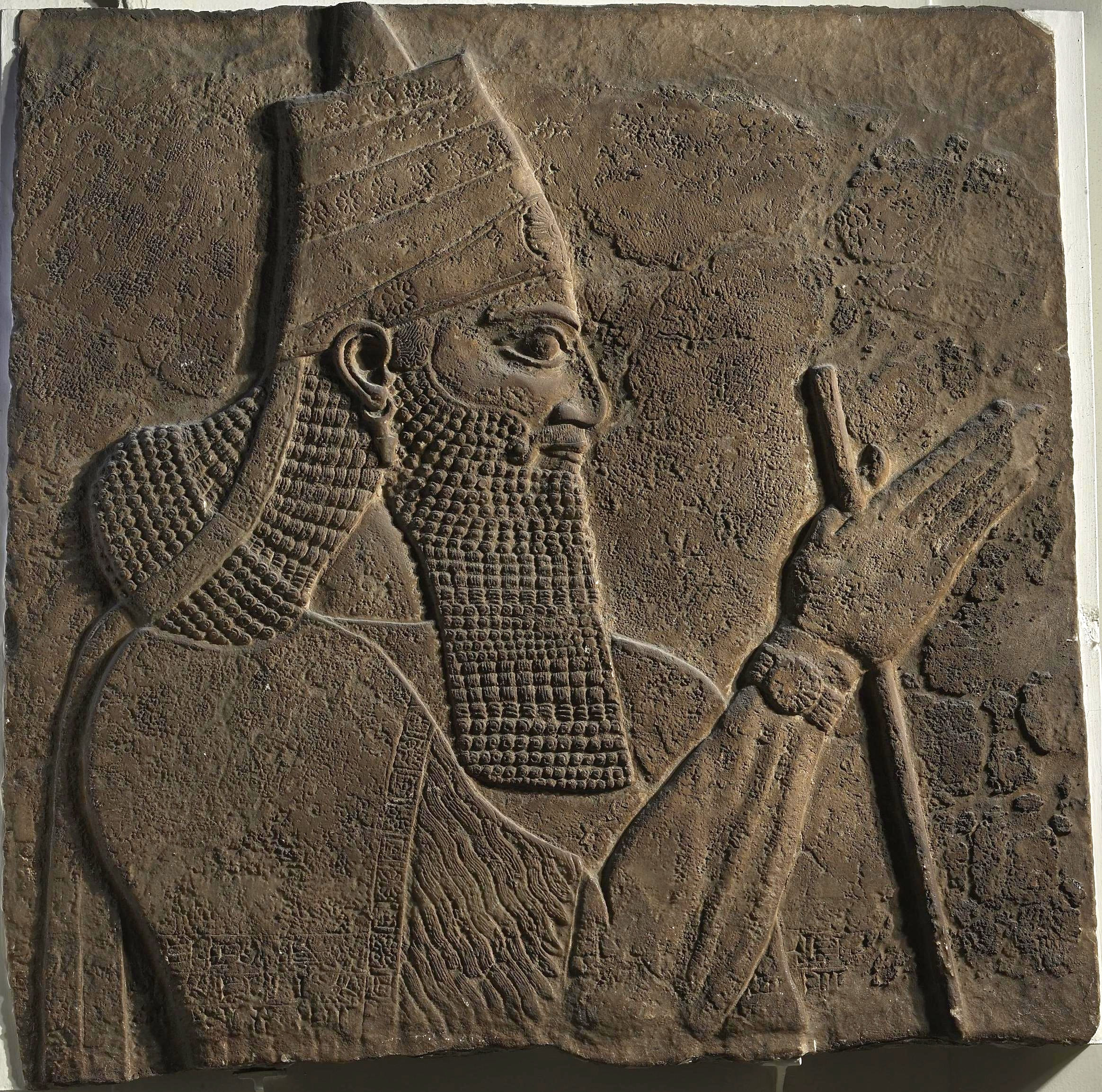
Partial relief depicting Tiglath-Pileser III (r. 745–727 BCE)

In 745 BCE, Ashur-nirari was succeeded by Tiglath-Pileser III (r. 745–727 BCE), probably another son of Adad-nirari III. His accession ushered in a new era of Neo-Assyrian history. While the conquests of earlier kings were impressive, they contributed little to Assyria's rise as a consolidated empire. Through campaigns aimed at conquest and not just extraction of seasonal tribute, as well as reforms meant to efficiently organize the army and centralize the realm, Tiglath-Pileser is regarded by some as the first true initiator of Assyria's "imperial" phase. Tiglath-Pileser is the earliest Assyrian king mentioned in the Babylonian Chronicles and the Hebrew Bible, and thus the earliest king for which there exists important outside perspectives on his reign.

Early on, Tiglath-Pileser reduced the influence of the previously powerful magnates, dividing their territories into smaller provinces under the rule of royally appointed provincial governors and withdrawing their right to commission official building inscriptions in their own names. Shamshi-ilu appears to have been subjected to a damnatio memoriae, as his name and tiles were erased from some of his inscriptions.

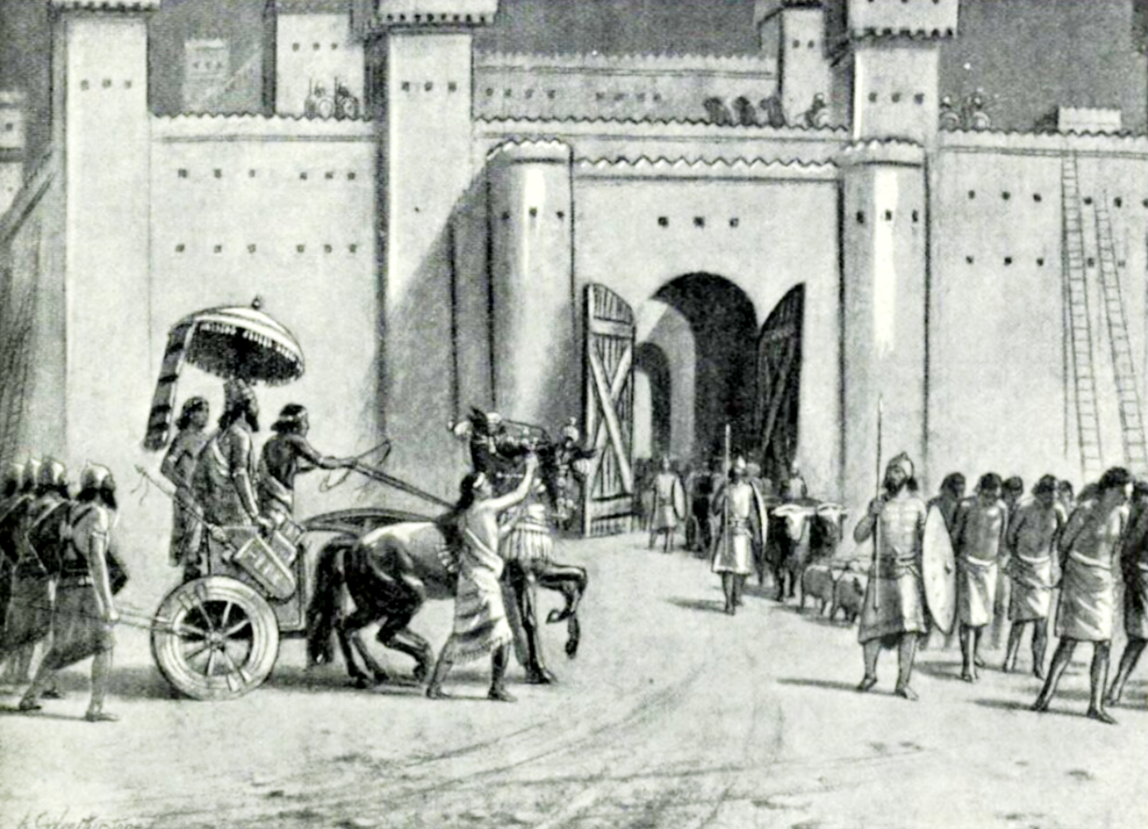
20th-century illustration of Tiglath-Pileser III's capture of Damascus

During his 18-year reign, Tiglath-Pileser campaigned in all directions. In his first year as king, he waged war against Nabonassar, the Chaldean king of Babylon, and conquered territories on the eastern bank of the Tigris. In 746 BCE, he conducted a successful campaign in the Zagros, where he created two new provinces. From 743 to 739 BCE, he focused on Urartu and northern Syria. Campaigns against both targets proved resoundingly successful; in 743 BCE, Sarduri II of Urartu was defeated, and in 740 BCE, Arpad, Syria was conquered after a three-year siege. With the nearest threats dealt with, Tiglath-Pileser began to focus on lands that had never been under solid Assyrian rule. In 738 BCE, the Neo-Hittite states of Pattin and Hatarikka, and the Phoenician city of Sumur were conquered. In 734 BCE, the Assyrian army marched through the Levant all the way to the Egyptian border, forcing several of the states on the way—such as Ammon, Edom, Moab and the Kingdom of Judah—to pay tribute and become Assyrian vassals. In 732 BCE, the Assyrians captured Damascus and much of Transjordan and Galilee. Tiglath-Pileser's conquests are, in addition to their extent, also noteworthy because of the large scale in which he undertook resettlement policies; he settled tens to hundreds of thousands of foreigners in both the Assyrian heartland and in distant, underdeveloped provinces.

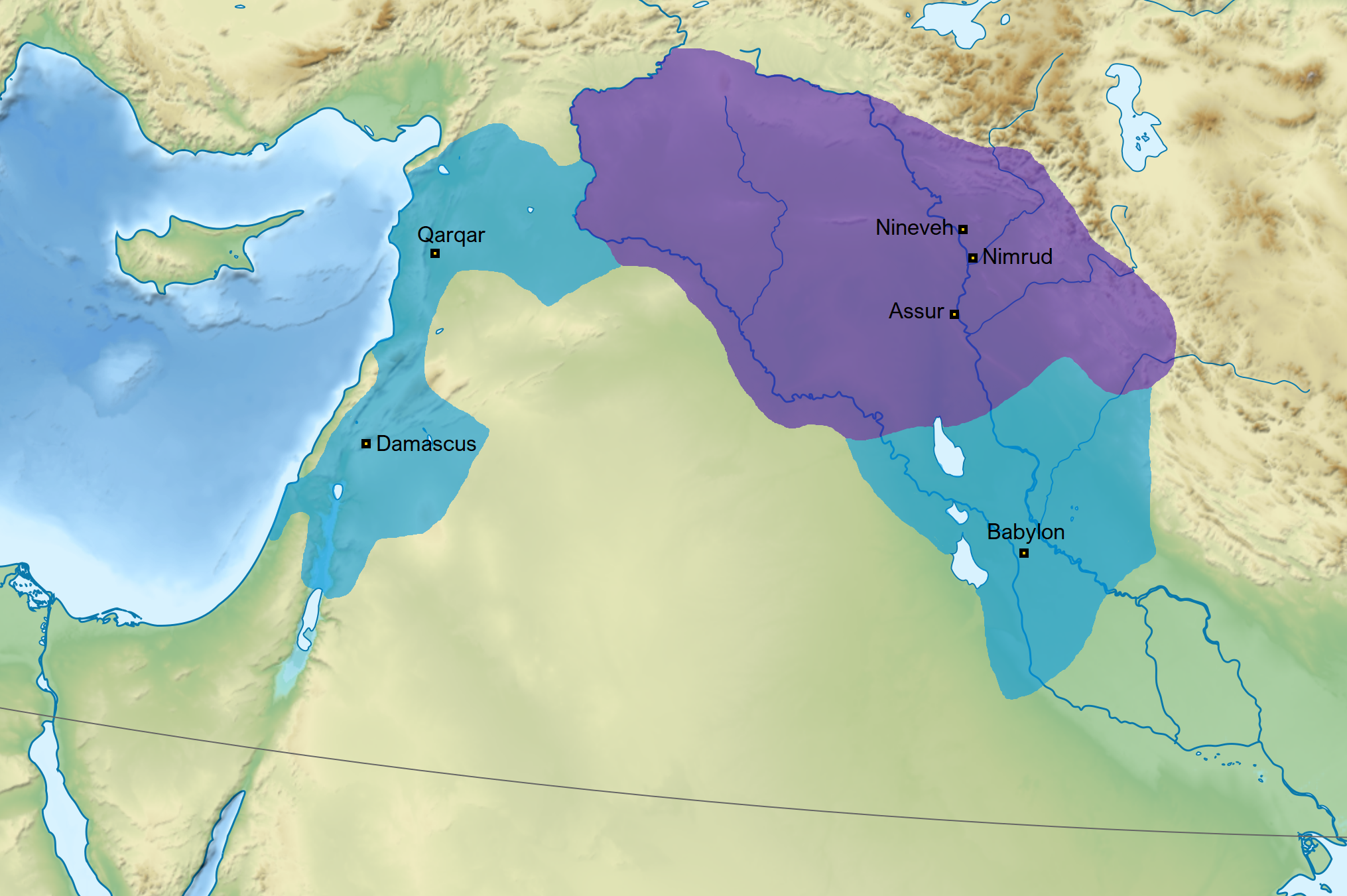
The Neo-Assyrian Empire at the start (purple) and end (blue) of Tiglath-Pileser III's reign

Late in his reign, Tiglath-Pileser turned his eye towards Lower Mesopotamia. For a long time, the political situation in the south had been volatile, with conflict between the traditional Babylonian urban elites of the cities, nomadic Arameans in the countryside, and Chaldean warlords in the south. In 732 BCE, the Chaldean warlord Nabû-mukin-zēri seized Babylon and became king, a development Tiglath-Pileser used as an excuse to invade. In 729 BCE, he captured Babylon, defeated Nabu-mukin-zēri, and thus assumed the titles "king of Babylon" and "king of Assyria." To increase the willingness of the Babylonian populace to accept him as ruler, Tiglath-Pileser twice partook in the traditional Babylonian Akitu (New Year's) celebrations, held in honor of the national deity Marduk. Control over Babylonia was secured through campaigns against the remaining Chaldean strongholds in the south. By the time of his death in 727 BCE, Tiglath-Pileser had more than doubled the territory of the empire. His policy of direct rule rather than rule through vassal states brought important changes to the Assyrian state and its economy; rather than tribute, the empire grew more reliant on taxes collected by provincial governors, a development which increased administrative costs but also reduced the need for military intervention.

Tiglath-Pileser was succeeded by his son Shalmaneser V (r. 727–722 BCE). Though little to no royal inscriptions and other sources survive from Shalmaneser's brief reign, the empire appears to have been largely stable under his rule. Shalmaneser managed to secure some lasting achievements; he was probably the Assyrian king responsible for the conquest of Samaria and the resulting Assyrian captivity, and thus bringing an end to the ancient Kingdom of Yisrael-Samaria, establishing the province of Samerina in its place. He also appears to have annexed lands in northern Syria and Cilicia.

=== Imperial apogee ===
==== Sargon II and Sennacherib ====
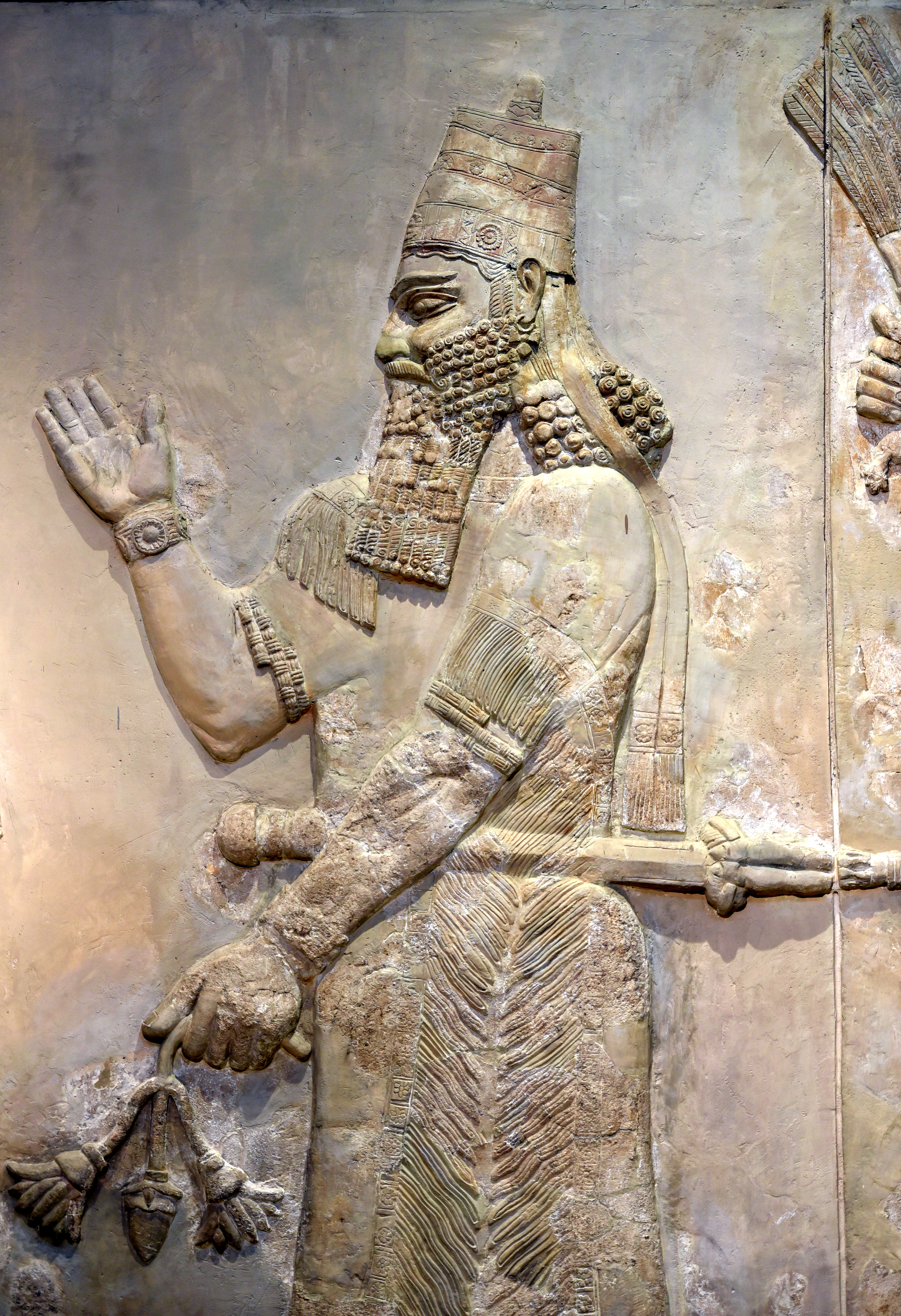
Relief depicting Sargon II, founder of the Sargonid dynasty

Shalmaneser was succeeded by Sargon II (r. 722–705 BCE), who in all likelihood was a usurper who deposed his predecessor in a palace coup. Like Tiglath-Pileser before him, Sargon in his inscriptions made no references to prior kings and instead ascribed his accession purely to divine selection. Sargon's rise to power marked the foundation of the Sargonid dynasty, leading to considerable internal unrest. In his own inscriptions, Sargon claims to have deported 6,300 "guilty Assyrians", probably Assyrians from the heartland who opposed his accession. Several peripheral regions of the empire also revolted and regained their independence. The most significant of the revolts was the successful uprising of the Chaldean warlord Marduk-apla-iddina II, who took control of Babylon, restoring Babylonian independence, and allied with the Elamite king Ḫuban‐nikaš I.

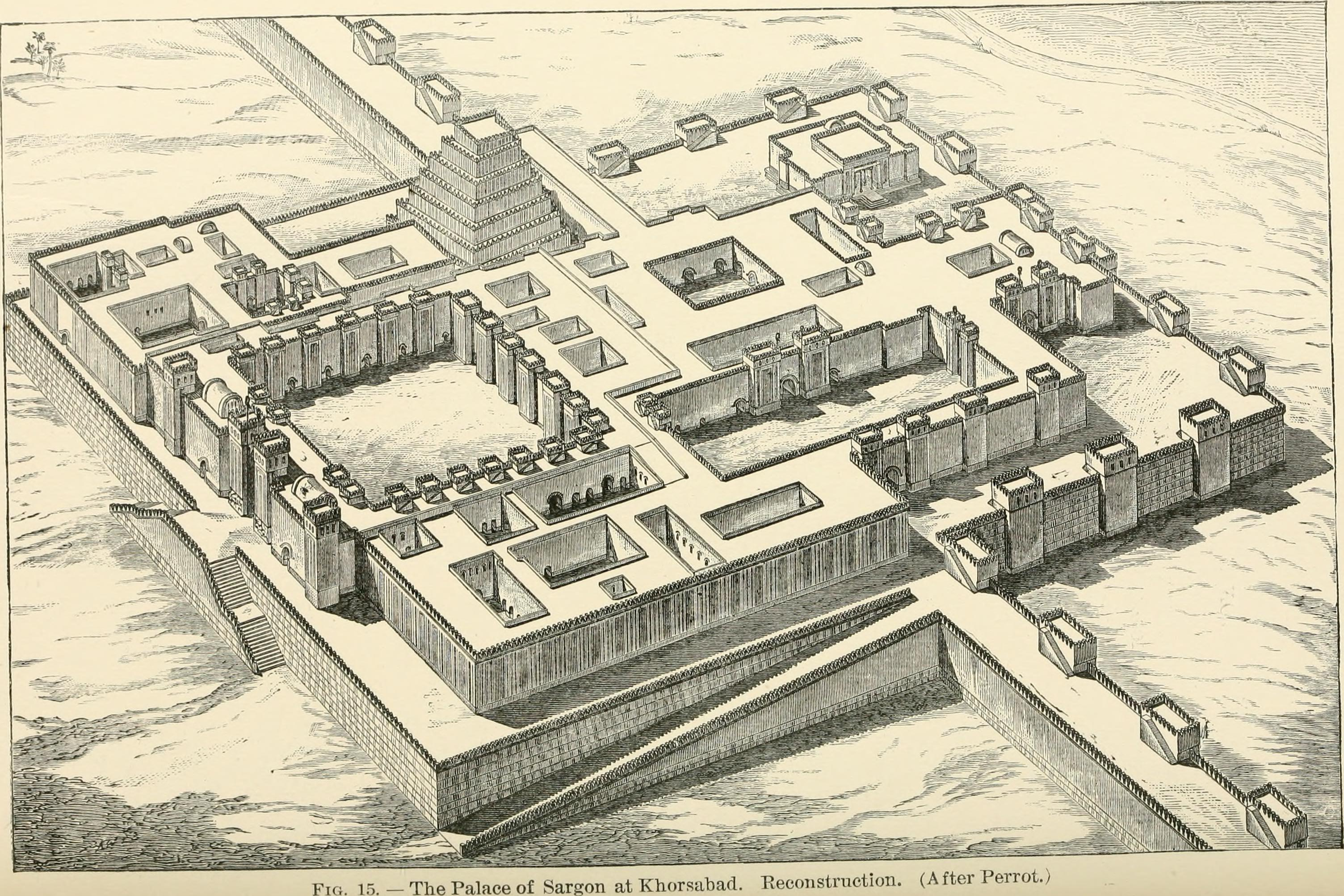
20th-century reconstruction of Sargon II's palace at Dur-Sharrukin

Though Sargon tried early on to dislodge Marduk-apla-iddina, attacking Aramean tribes who supported Marduk-apla-iddina and marching out to fight the Elamites, his efforts were initially unsuccessful, and in 720 BCE, the Elamites defeated Sargon's forces at Der. Sargon's early reign was more successful in the west. There, another movement, led by Yau-bi'di of Hamath and supported by Simirra, Damascus, Samaria and Arpad, also sought to regain independence and threatened to destroy the sophisticated provincial system imposed on the region under Tiglath-Pileser. While Sargon was campaigning in the east in 720 BCE, his generals defeated Yau-bi'di and the others. Sargon continued to focus on both east and west, successfully warring against Šinuḫtu in Anatolia and Mannaya in western Iran.

In 717 BCE, Sargon retook Carchemish and secured the city's substantial silver treasury. Perhaps it was the acquisition of these funds that inspired Sargon to begin constructing a new capital of the empire from scratch, named Dur-Sharrukin ("Fort Sargon") after himself. Perhaps the motivating factor was that Sargon did not feel safe at Nimrud after the early conspiracies against him. As construction work progressed, Sargon continued to go on military campaigns, which ensured that Assyria's geopolitical dominance and influence expanded significantly in his reign. Between 716 and 713 BCE, Sargon fought against Urartu, the Medes, Arab tribes, and Ionian pirates in the eastern Mediterranean. A significant victory was the 714 BCE campaign against Urartu, in which Rusa I was defeated and much of the Urartian heartland was plundered.

In 709 BCE Sargon won against seven kings in the land of Ia', in the district of Iadnana or Atnana. The land of Ia' is assumed to be the Assyrian name for Cyprus, and some scholars suggest that the latter may mean 'the islands of the Danaans', or Greece. There are other inscriptions referring to the land of Ia' in Sargon's palace at Khorsabad. Cyprus was thus absorbed into the Assyrian Empire, with the victory commemorated with a stele found near present-day Larnaca.

Late in his reign, Sargon again turned his attention to Babylon. When Sargon marched south in 710 BCE he encountered little resistance. After Marduk-apla-iddina fled to Dur-Yakin, the stronghold of his Chaldean tribe, the citizens of Babylon willingly opened the gates of Babylon to Sargon. The situation was somewhat uncertain until Sargon made peace with Marduk-apla-iddina after prolonged negotiations, which resulted in Marduk-apla-iddina and his family being given the right to escape to Elam in exchange for Sargon being allowed to dismantle the walls of Dur-Yakin. Between 710 and 707 BCE, Sargon resided in Babylon, receiving foreign delegations there and participating in local traditions, such as the Akitu festival. In 707 BCE Sargon returned to Nimrud, and in 706 BCE Dur-Sharrukin was inaugurated as the empire's capital. Sargon did not get to enjoy his new city for long; in 705 BCE he embarked on his final campaign, directed against Tabal in Anatolia. Sargon was killed in battle, and the army was unable to recover his body.

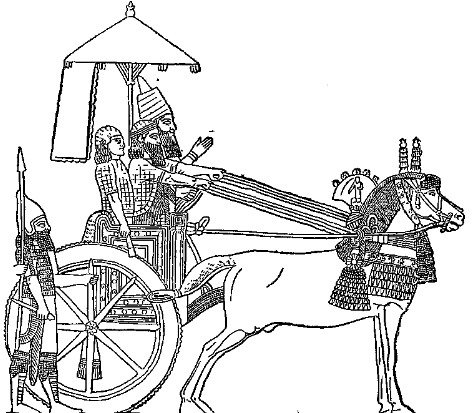
Line-drawing of a relief depicting Sennacherib (r. 705–681 BCE) on campaign in a chariot

Shocked and frightened by the manner of his father's death and its theological implications, Sargon's son Sennacherib distanced himself from his father. Sennacherib never mentioned Sargon in his inscriptions and abandoned Dur-Sharrukin, instead moving the capital to Nineveh, previously the residence of the crown prince. One of the first building projects he undertook was restoring a temple dedicated to the death-god Nergal, likely due to worries concerning his father's fate. Several of the vassal states in the Levant stopped paying tribute, and Marduk-apla-iddina retook Babylon with the aid of the Elamites.

Sennacherib was thus faced with numerous enemies almost immediately upon his accession, and it took years to defeat them all. In 704 BCE he sent the Assyrian army, led by officials, to Anatolia to avenge Sargon's death. Sennacherib began warring against Marduk-apla-iddina. After fighting against Babylonia for nearly two years, Sennacherib succeeded in recapturing Babylonia, though Marduk-apla-iddina fled to Elam once again, and Bel-ibni, a Babylonian noble who had been raised at the Assyrian court, was installed as vassal king of Babylon.

In 701 BCE Sennacherib undertook the most famous campaign of his reign, invading the Levant to force the states there to pay tribute again. This conflict is the first Assyrian war to be recorded in great detail sources other than Assyrian inscriptions including the Hebrew Bible. The Assyrian account diverges somewhat from the Biblical one; whereas the Assyrian inscriptions describe the campaign as a resounding success, in which tribute was regained, some states were annexed outright and Sennacherib even managed to stop Egyptian ambitions in the region, the Bible describes Sennacherib suffering a crushing defeat outside Jerusalem. Since Hezekiah, the king of Judah (who ruled Jerusalem), paid a heavy tribute to Sennacherib after the campaign, modern scholars consider it more likely that the Biblical account, motivated by theological concerns, is highly distorted and that Sennacherib succeeded in his goals of the campaign and re-imposed Assyrian authority in the region. Despite this, Herodotus, a Greek historian, noted an Assyrian defeat. The majority of scholars in this area believe the discrepancy is due to two sieges, one resulting in an Assyrian victory, the other in a failure.

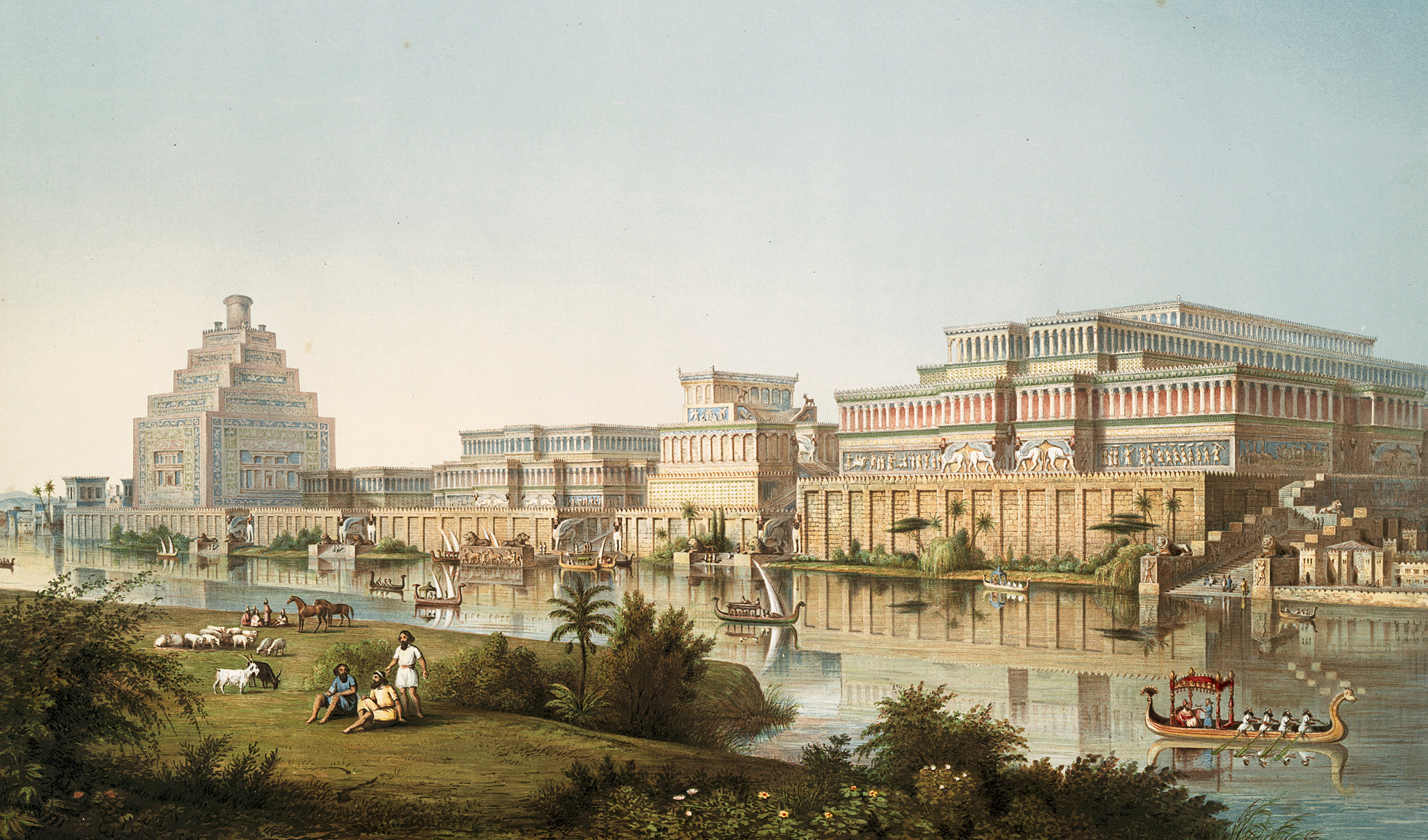
19th-century reconstruction of Nineveh, made capital under Sennacherib

Bel-ibni's tenure as Babylonian vassal ruler did not last long, and he continually opposed by Marduk-apla-iddina and another Chaldean warlord, Mushezib-Marduk, who hoped to seize power for themselves. In 700 BCE Sennacherib invaded Babylonia again and drove Marduk-apla-iddina and Mushezib-Marduk away. Needing a vassal ruler with stronger authority, he placed his eldest son, Ashur-nadin-shumi, on the throne of Babylon. For a few years, internal peace was restored, and Sennacherib kept the army busy with a few minor campaigns. During this time, Sennacherib focused his attention mainly on building projects; between 699 and 695 BCE he ambitiously renovated Nineveh, constructing among other works the Southwest Palace and a 12 kilometer (7.5-mile) long and 25 meter (82 feet) tall wall. It is possible that a large park constructed near the Southwest Palace served as the inspiration for the Hanging Gardens of Babylon. Sennacherib's choice of making Nineveh capital probably resulted not only from him having long lived in the city as crown prince, but also because of its ideal location, being an important point in the established road and trade systems and also located close to an important ford across the Tigris river.

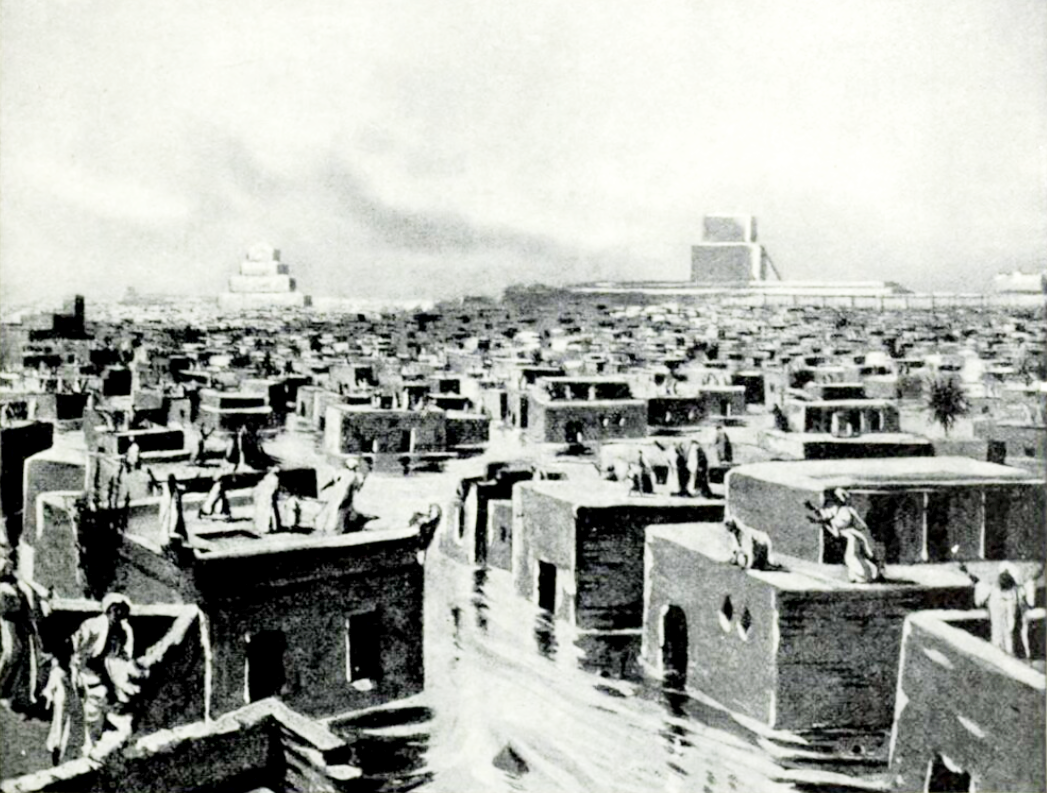
20th-century illustration of Sennacherib's destruction of Babylon

In 694 BCE Sennacherib invaded Elam, with the explicit goal to root out Marduk-apla-iddina and his supporters. Sennacherib sailed across the Persian Gulf with a fleet built by Phoenician and Greek shipwrights and captured and sacked countless Elamite cities. He never got his revenge on Marduk-apla-iddina, who died of natural causes before the Assyrian army landed, and the campaign instead significantly escalated the conflict with the anti-Assyrian faction in Babylonia and with the Elamites. The Elamite king Hallushu-Inshushinak took revenge on Sennacherib by marching on Babylonia while the Assyrians were busy in his lands. During this campaign, Ashur-nadin-shumi was captured and taken to Elam, where he was probably executed. In his place, the Elamites and Babylonians crowned the Babylonian noble Nergal-ushezib as king of Babylon. Though Senacherib just a few months later defeated and captured Nergal-ushezib in battle, the war dragged on as the Chaldean warlord Mushezib-Marduk took control of Babylon late in 693 BCE and assembled a large coalition of Chaldeans, Arameans, Arabs and Elamites to resist Assyrian retribution. After a series of battles, Sennacherib finally recaptured Babylon in 689 BCE. Mushezib-Marduk was captured and Babylon was destroyed in an effort to eradicate Babylonian political identity.

The last years of Sennacherib's reign were relatively peaceful, but problems began to arise within the royal court. Though Sennacherib's next eldest son, Arda-Mulissu, had replaced Ashur-nadin-shumi as heir, around 684 BCE the younger son Esarhaddon was proclaimed heir instead. Perhaps Sennacherib was influenced by Esarhaddon's mother Naqi'a, who in later times became increasingly prominent and powerful. Disappointed, Arda-Mulissu and his supporters pressured Sennacherib to reinstate him as heir. Though they succeeded in forcing Esarhaddon into exile in the west for his own protection, Sennacherib did not accept Arda-Mulissu as heir. In late 681 BCE Arda-Mulissu killed his father in a temple in Nineveh. Because of the regicide, Arda-Mulissu lost some of his previous support and was unable to undergo a coronation before Esarhaddon returned with an army. Two months after Sennacherib was murdered, Esarhaddon captured Nineveh and became king, Arda-Mulissu and his supporters fleeing from the empire.

==== Esarhaddon and Ashurbanipal ====
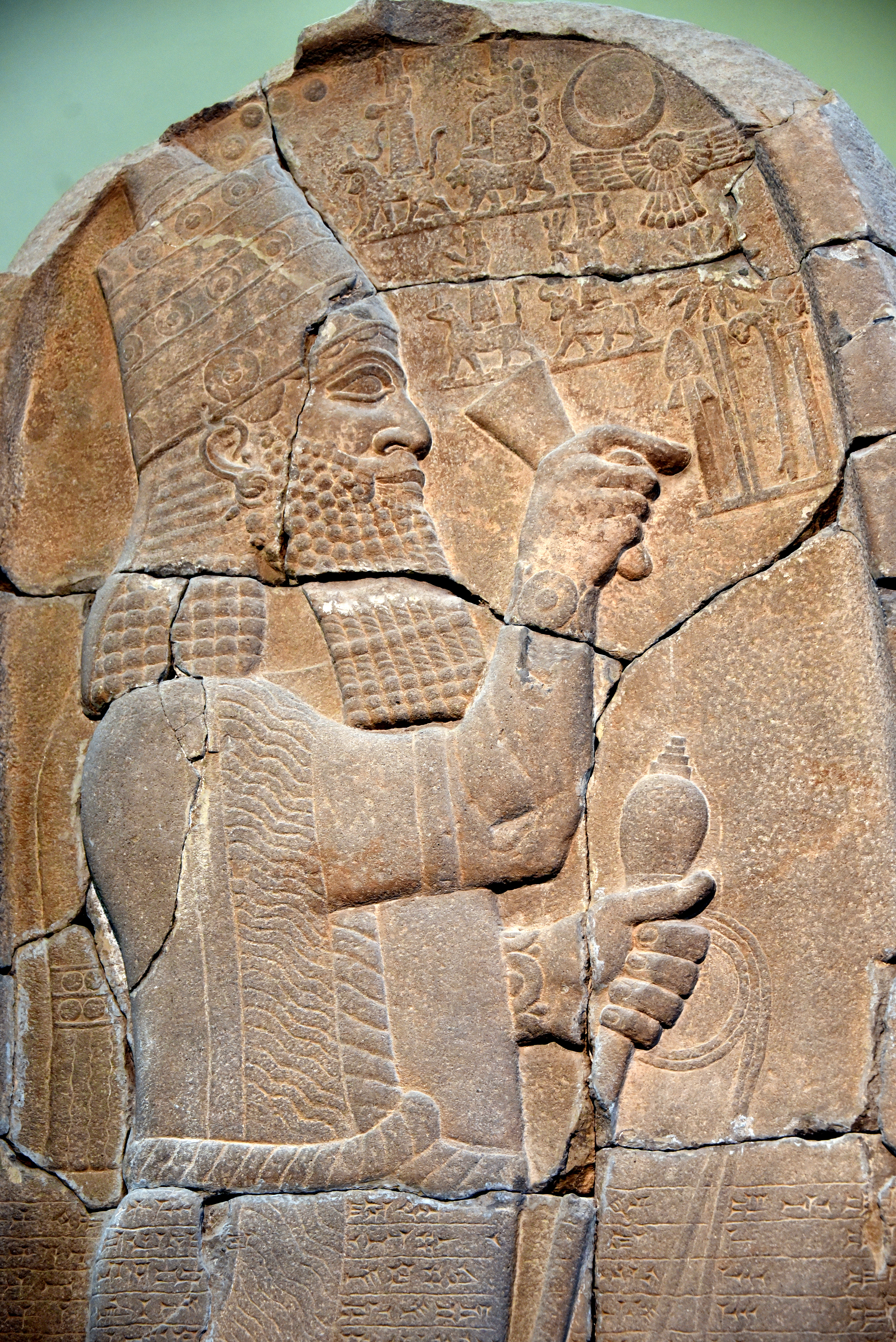
Esarhaddon as depicted in his victory stele

Esarhaddon sought to establish a balance of power between the northern and southern parts of his empire. Thus, he rebuilt Babylon in the south, viewing Sennacherib's destruction of the city as excessively brutal, but also made sure not to neglect the temples and cults of Assyria. As a result of his tumultuous rise to the throne he was distrustful of his officials and family members; something which also had the side effect of an increased prominence of women in his reign, whom he trusted more. Esarhaddon's mother Naqi'a, his queen Esharra-hammat and his daughter Serua-eterat were all more powerful and prominent than most women in earlier Assyrian history. The king was also frequently ill and sickly and also appears to have suffered from depression, which intensified after the deaths of his queen and several of his children.

Despite his physical and mental health, Esarhaddon led many successful military campaigns, several of them farther away from the Assyrian heartland than those of any previous king. He defeated the Cimmerians who plagued the northwestern part of the empire, conquered the cities of Kundu and Sissû in Anatolia, and conquered the Phoenician city of Sidon, which was renamed Kar-Aššur‐aḫu‐iddina ("fortress of Esarhaddon"). After fighting the Medes in the Zagros Mountains, Esarhaddon campaigned further to the east than any king before him, reaching as far into what is now Iran as Dasht-e Kavir, in the Assyrian conquest of Elam. Esarhaddon also invaded the eastern Arabian peninsula where he conquered a large number of cities, including Diḫranu (modern Dhahran).

20th-century illustration of the Assyrians capturing Memphis, the Egyptian capital, during the Assyrian conquest of Egypt

Esarhaddon's greatest military achievement was his 671 BCE conquest of Egypt. With logistical support from various Arab tribes, the 671 BCE invasion took a difficult route through central Sinai and caught the Egyptian armies by surprise. After a series of three large battles against Pharaoh Taharqa, Esarhaddon captured Memphis, the Egyptian capital. Taharqa fled south to Nubia, and Esarhaddon allowed most of the local governors to remain in place, though he left some of his representatives to oversee them. The conquest of Egypt brought the Neo-Assyrian Empire to its greatest extent.

During the reign of Esarhaddon, an alliance between the Bartatua dynasty of Scythia and Assyria was possibly established. In 676 BCE, Esarhaddon gave his daughter Šērūʾa-ēṭirat in marriage to Bartatua, with a legal submission that Bartatua had to take an oath of allegiance and thus become an Assyrian vassal state. While history is not explicit in whether Bartatua ever married Esarhaddon's daughter, it seems probable considering Assyria defeated Media in 653-652 BCE with Scythian assistance, and the firm Scythian-Assyrian alliance that persisted until the fall of Assyria. Šērūʾa-ēṭirat was most likely the mother of king Madyes, who inherited the throne after Bartatua.

Though he was among the most successful kings in Assyrian history, Esarhaddon faced numerous conspiracies against his rule, perhaps because the king suffering from illness could be seen as the gods withdrawing their divine support for his rule. Around the time of the Egyptian campaigns, there were at least three major insurgencies against Esarhaddon; in Nineveh, the chief eunuch Ashur-nasir was prophesied by a Babylonian hostage to replace Esarhaddon as king; a prophetess in Harran proclaimed that Esarhaddon and his lineage would be "destroyed" and that a usurper named Sasî would become king; and in Assur, the local governor instigated a plot after receiving a prophetic dream in which a child rose from a tomb and handed him a staff. Through a well-developed network of spies and informants, Esarhaddon uncovered all of these coup attempts and in 670 BCE had a large number of high-ranking officials put to death.

In 672 BCE, Esarhaddon decreed that his younger son Ashurbanipal (r. 669–631 BCE) would succeed him in Assyria and that the older son Shamash-shum-ukin would rule Babylon. To ensure that the succession to the throne would go more smoothly than his own accession, Esarhaddon forced everyone in the empire, not only the prominent officials but also far-away vassal rulers and members of the royal family, to swear oaths of allegiance to the successors and respect the arrangement. When Esarhaddon died of an illness while on his way to campaign in Egypt in 669 BCE, Naqi'a forced similar oaths of allegiance to Ashurbanipal, who became king without incident. One year later, Ashurbanipal oversaw Shamash-shum-ukin's inauguration as (largely ceremonial) king of Babylon.

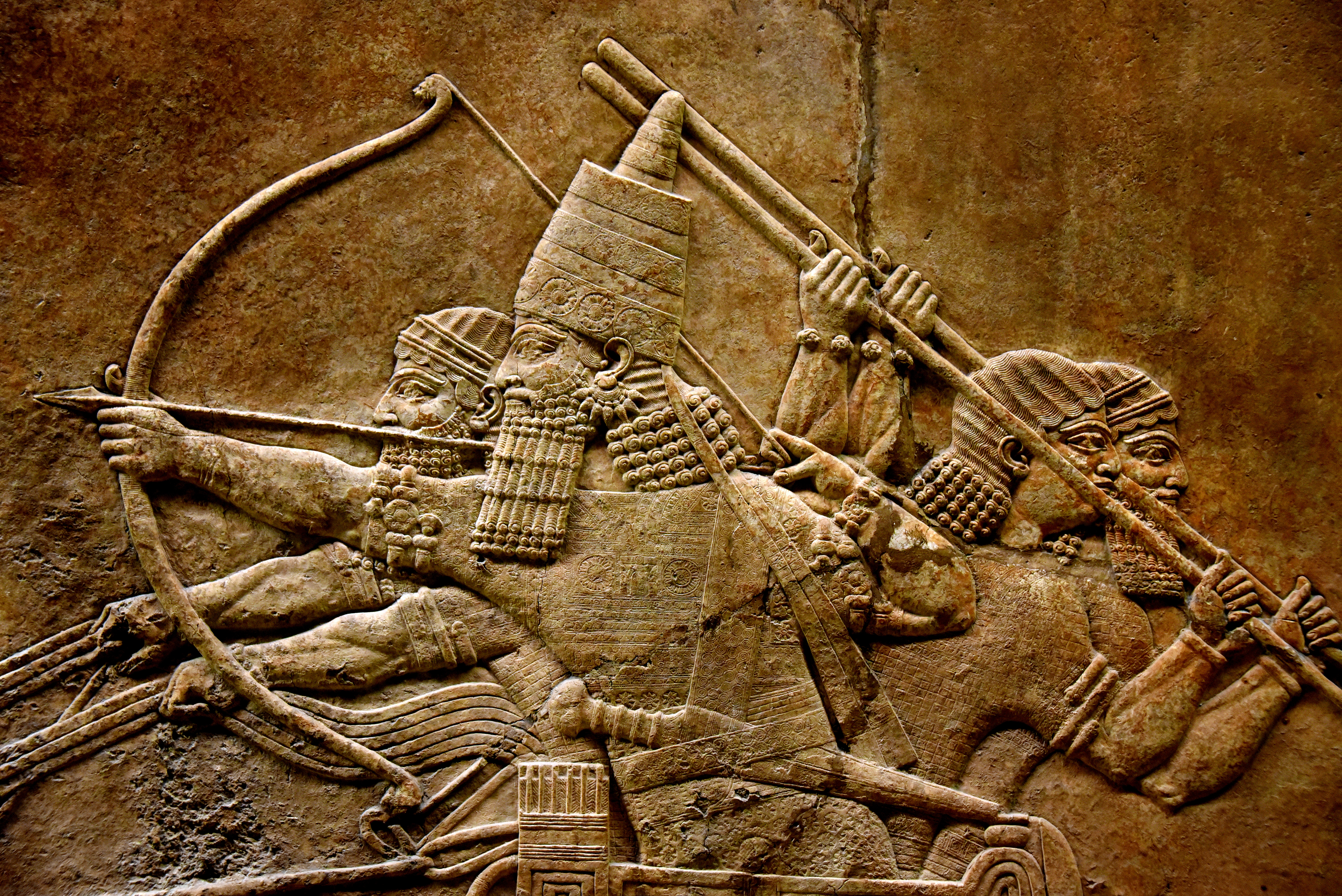
Relief depicting Ashurbanipal in a chariot, armed with a bow

Ashurbanipal is often regarded to have been the last great king of Assyria. His reign saw the last time Assyrian troops marched in all directions of the Near East. In 667 and 664 BCE, Ashurbanipal invaded Egypt in the wake of anti-Assyrian uprisings; both Pharaoh Taharqa and his nephew Tantamani were defeated, and Ashurbanipal captured the southern Egyptian capital of Thebes, from which enormous amounts of plundered booty was sent back to Assyria. In 664 BCE, after a prolonged period of peace, the Elamite king Urtak launched a surprise invasion of Babylonia which renewed hostilities. After indecisive campaigns for ten years, the Elamite king Teumman was defeated in 653 BCE, captured and executed in a battle by the Ulai river. Teumman's head was brought back to Nineveh and displayed for the public. Elam however, remained undefeated and continued to work against Assyria for some time.

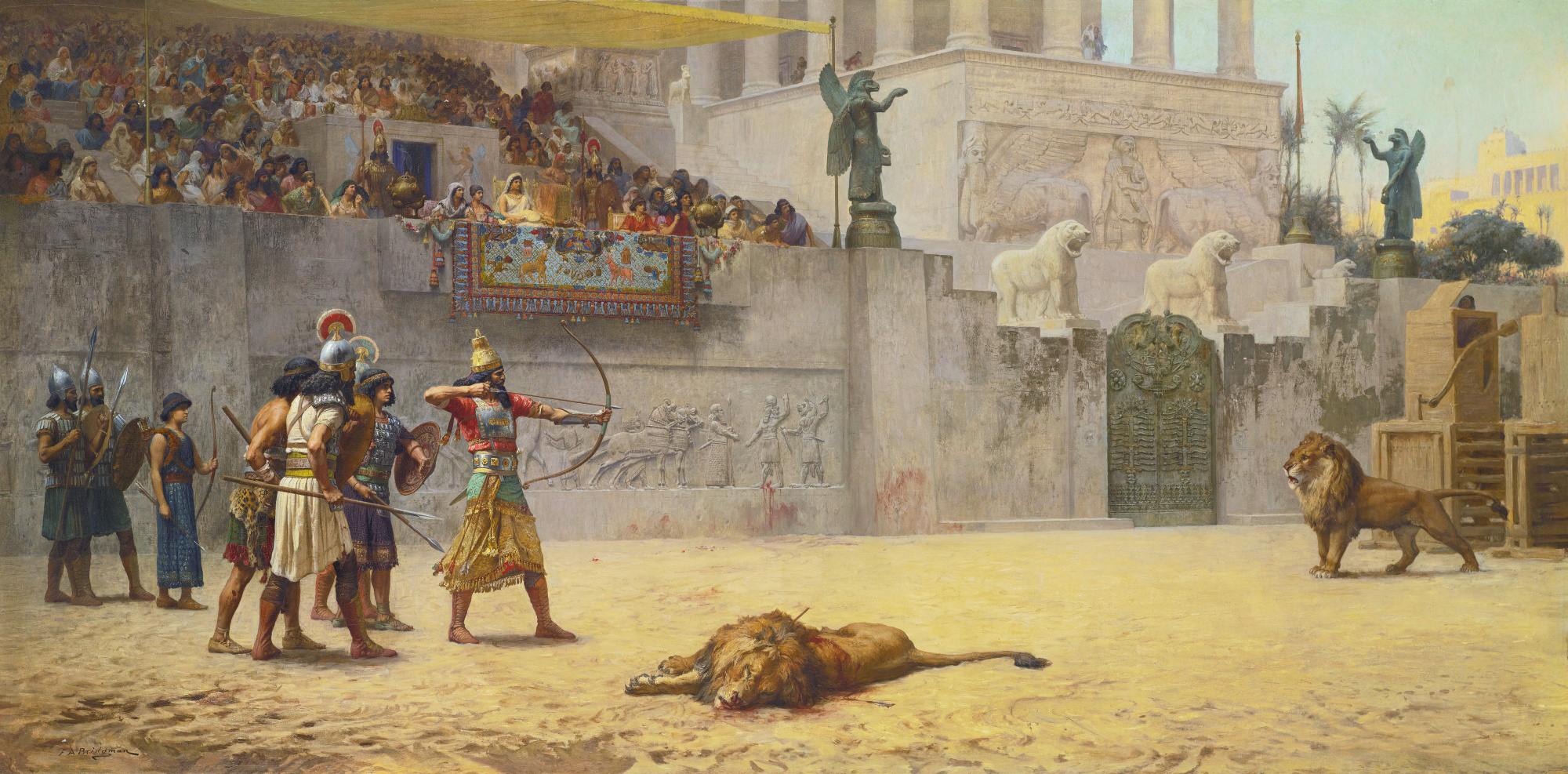
The Diversion of an Assyrian King (1876) by Frederick Arthur Bridgman

One of the growing problems in Ashurbanipal's early reign were disagreements between Ashurbanipal and Shamash-shum-ukin. While Esarhaddon's documents suggest that Shamash-shum-ukin was intended to inherit all of Babylonia, it appears that he only controlled the immediate vicinity of Babylon since numerous other Babylonian cities apparently ignored him and considered Ashurbanipal to be their king. Over time, it seems that Shamash-shum-ukin grew to resent his brother's overbearing control, and in 652 BCE he revolted with the aid of several Elamite kings. In 648 BCE Ashurbanipal captured Babylon after a long siege and devastated the city. Shamash-shum-ukin might have died by setting himself on fire in his palace. Ashurbanipal replaced him with the puppet ruler Kandalanu and then marched on Elam. The Elamite capital of Susa was captured and devastated, and large numbers of Elamite prisoners were brought to Nineveh, tortured and humiliated. Ashurbanipal chose to not annex and integrate Elam into the Neo-Assyrian Empire, instead leaving it open and undefended. In the following decades, the Persians would migrate into the region and rebuild the ruined Elamite strongholds for their own use.

Though Ashurbanipal's inscriptions present Assyria as an uncontested and divinely supported hegemon over all the world, cracks were starting to form in the empire during his reign. At some point after 656 BCE, the empire lost control of Egypt, which was ruled by Pharaoh Psamtik I, founder of Egypt's twenty-sixth dynasty. Ashurbanipal went on numerous campaigns against various Arab tribes, which failed to consolidate rule over their lands and wasted Assyrian resources. Perhaps most importantly, his devastation of Babylon after defeating Shamash-shum-ukin fanned anti-Assyrian sentiments in southern Mesopotamia, which soon after his death would have disastrous consequences. Ashurbanipal's reign also appears to have seen a growing disconnect between the king and the traditional elite of the empire; eunuchs grew powerful in his time, being granted large tracts of lands and numerous tax exemptions.

=== Collapse and fall of the empire ===
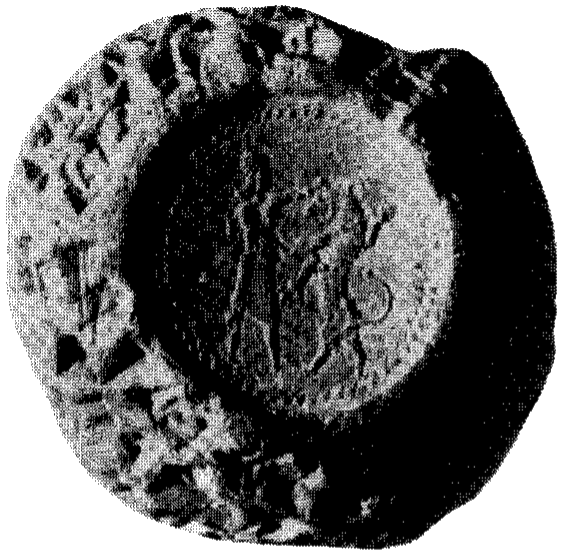
Impression of a seal possibly belonging to the eunuch usurper Sîn-šumu-līšir (r. 626 BCE)

After Ashurbanipal's death in 631 BCE, the throne was inherited by his son, Aššur-etil-ilāni. Though some historians have forwarded the idea that Ashur-etil-ilani was a minor upon his accession, this is unlikely given that he is attested to have had children during his brief reign. Despite being his father's legitimate successor, he appears to have been installed against considerable opposition with the aid of the chief eunuch, Sîn-šumu-līšir. Assyrian official Nabû-riḫtu-uṣūr appears to have attempted to usurp the throne, but Sîn-šumu-līšir swiftly crushed his revolt. Since excavated ruins at Nineveh from around the time of Ashurbanipal's death show evidence of fire damage, the plot might have resulted in violence and unrest within the capital.

Aššur-etil-ilāni appears to have been a relatively idle ruler; no records of any military campaigns are known, and his palace at Nimrud was much smaller than that of previous kings. It is possible that the government was more or less run by Sîn-šumu-līšir throughout his reign. After a reign of four years, Aššur-etil-ilāni died in unclear circumstances in 627 BCE and was succeeded by his brother, Sîn-šar-iškun.

Sîn-šar-iškun's accession did not go unchallenged. Immediately upon his rise to the throne, Sîn-šumu-līšir rebelled and attempted to claim the throne for himself, despite the lack of any genealogical claim and as the only eunuch to ever do so in Assyrian history. Sîn-šumu-līšir successfully seized several prominent cities in Babylonia, including Nippur and Babylon, but was defeated by Sîn-šar-iškun after three months. This victory did little to alleviate Sîn-šar-iškun's problems. The Babylonian vassal king Kandalanu also died in 627 BCE. The swift regime changes and internal unrest bolstered Babylonian hopes to shake off Assyrian rule and regain independence, a movement which swiftly proclaimed Nabopolassar as its leader, who was probably a member of a prominent political family in Uruk. Some months after Sin-shumu-lishir's defeat, Nabopolassar and his allies captured both Nippur and Babylon, though the Assyrian response was swift and Nippur was recaptured in October 626 BCE. Sîn-šar-iškun's attempts to retake Babylon and Uruk were unsuccessful, however, and in the aftermath Nabopolassar was formally invested as king of Babylon in November 626 BCE, restoring Babylonia as an independent kingdom.

In the years that followed Nabopolassar's coronation, Babylonia became a brutal battleground between Assyrian and Babylonian armies. Though cities often repeatedly changed hands, the Babylonians slowly pushed Sîn-šar-iškun's armies out of the south. Under Sîn-šar-iškun's personal leadership, the Assyrian campaigns against Nabopolassar initially looked to be successful: in 625 BCE, Sippar was retaken and Nabopolassar failed to take Nippur; in 623 BCE, the Assyrians recaptured Nabopolassar's ancestral home city Uruk. Sîn-šar-iškun might ultimately have been victorious had it not been for a usurper, whose name is not known, from the empire's western territories rebelling in 622 BCE, marching on Nineveh and seizing the capital. Though this usurper was defeated by Sîn-šar-iškun after 100 days, the absence of the Assyrian army allowed Nabopolassar's forces to capture all of Babylonia in 622–620 BCE. Despite this loss, there was little reason for the Assyrians to suspect that Nabopolassar's consolidation of Babylonia was a significant event and not simply a temporary inconvenience; in previous Babylonian uprisings the Babylonians had at times gained the upper hand temporarily.

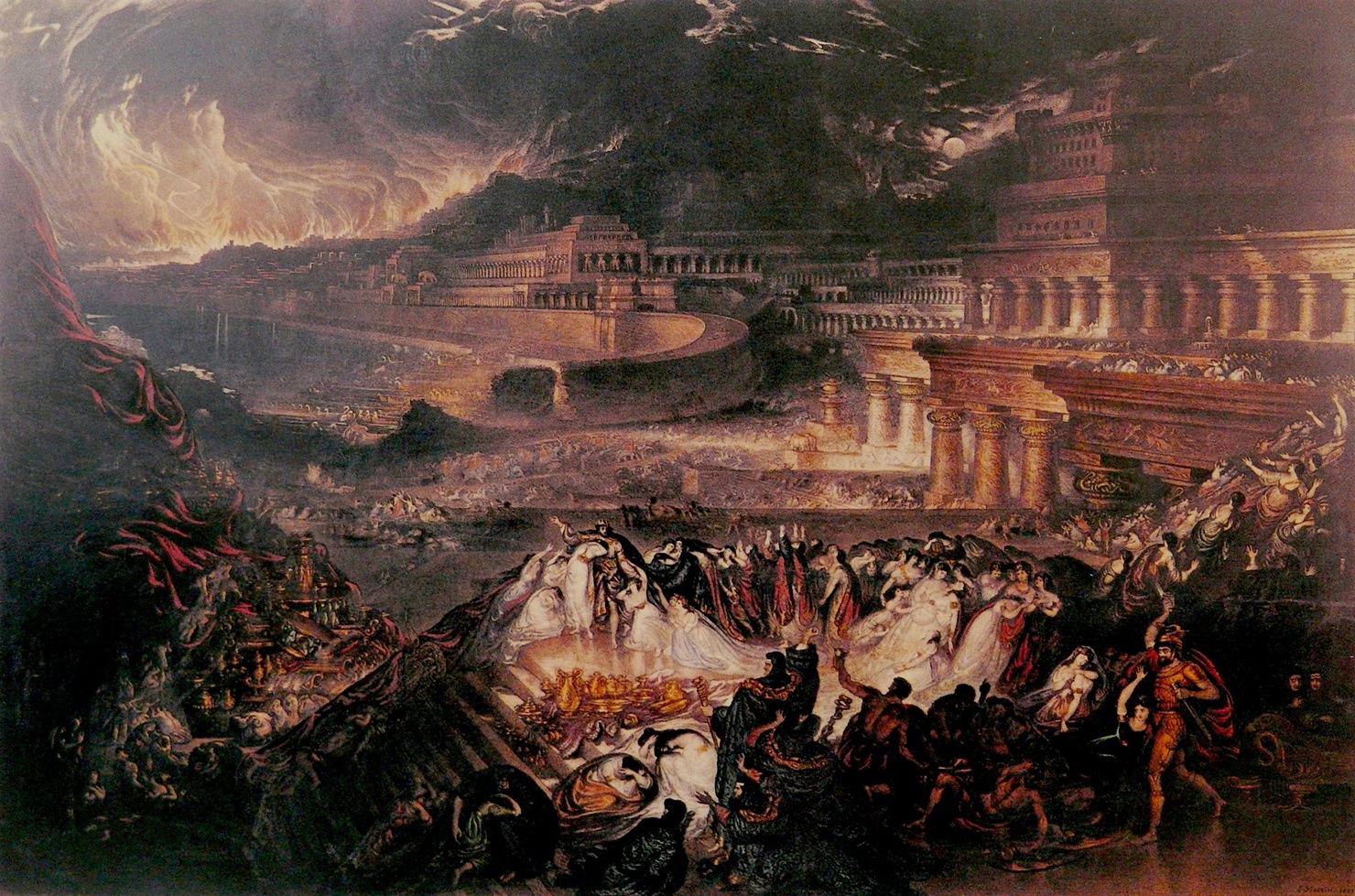
Fall of Nineveh (1829) by John Martin

More alarming were Nabopolassar's first forays into the Assyrian heartland in 616 BCE, which involved capturing border cities and defeating local Assyrian garrisons. The Assyrian heartland had not been invaded for 500 years, and the event illustrated that the situation was dire enough for Pharaoh Psamtik to enter the conflict on Assyria's side. Psamtik was primarily interested in keeping Assyria as a buffer between his growing empire and the Babylonians and other powers in the east. In May 615 BCE, Nabopolassar assaulted Assur, the empire's southernmost remaining city. Sinsharishkun succeeded in repulsing Nabopolassar's assault and, for a time, saving the old city.

It is doubtful that Nabopolassar would have achieved a lasting victory without the entrance of the Median Empire into the conflict. Long fragmented into several tribes and often targets of Assyrian military campaigns, the Medes had been united under the leadership of Cyaxares. In late 615 or in 614 BCE, Cyaxares and his army entered Assyria and conquered the region around Arrapḫa in preparation for a campaign against Sinsharishkun. The Medes mounted attacks on both Nimrud and Nineveh and captured Assur, leading to the ancient city being brutally plundered and its inhabitants being massacred. Nabopolassar arrived at Assur after the sack and met and allied with Cyaxares. In 612 BCE, after a siege lasting two months, the Medes and Babylonians captured Nineveh, and Sinsharishkun died defending the city. The capture of the city was followed by extensive looting and destruction, and effectively meant the end of the Neo-Assyrian Empire.

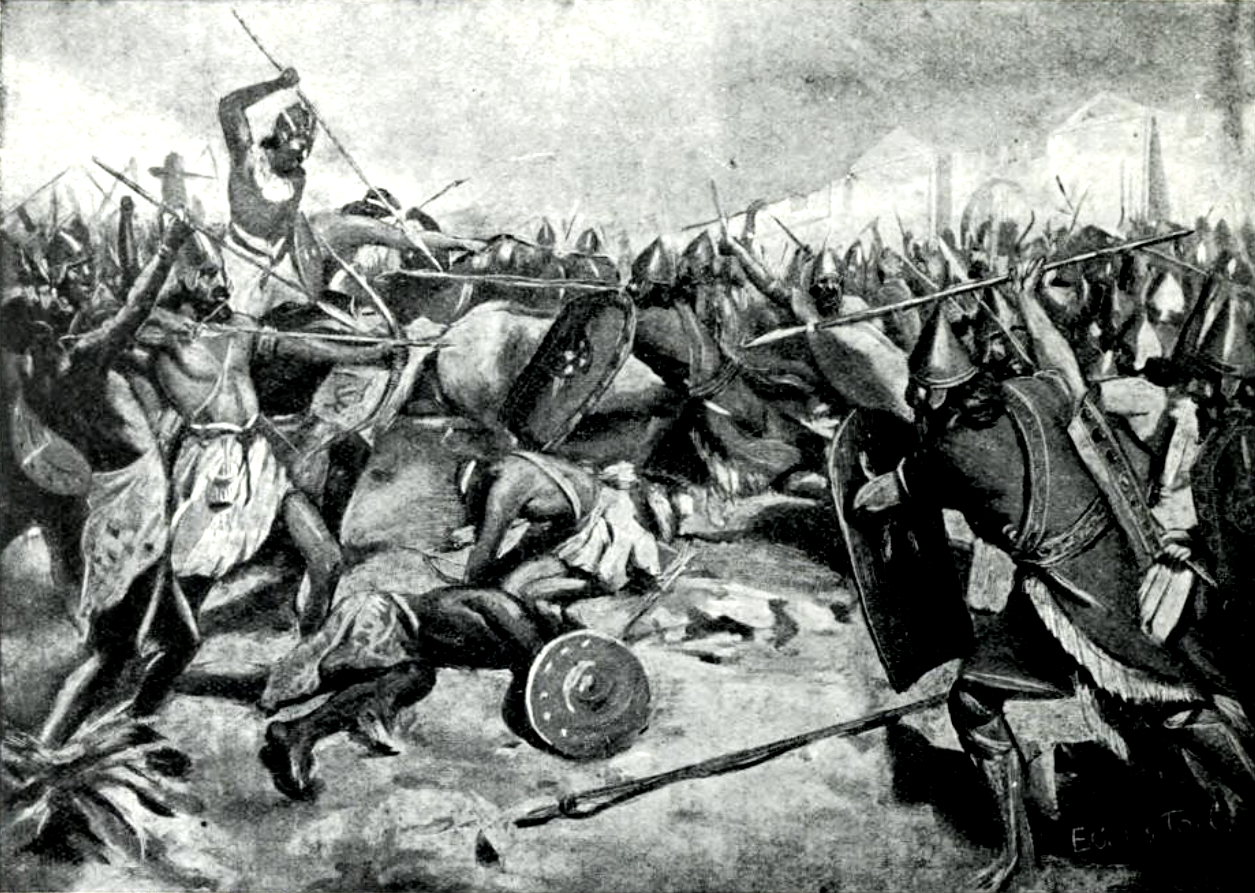
20th-century illustration of the Battle of Carchemish

After the fall of Nineveh, an Assyrian general and prince, possibly Sîn-šar-iškun's son, led the remnants of the Assyrian army and established himself at Harran in the west. The prince chose the regnal name Aššur-uballiṭ II With the loss of Assur, Aššur-uballiṭ could not undergo the traditional coronation ritual and as such formally ruled under the title of "crown prince", though Babylonian documents considered him the king. Aššur-uballiṭ's rule at Harran lasted until late 610 or early 609 BCE, when the city was captured by the Babylonians and the Medes. Three months later, an attempt by Aššur-uballiṭ II and the Egyptians to retake the city failed disastrously, and Aššur-uballiṭ disappears from the sources, his ultimate fate unknown. The remnants of the Assyrian army continued to fight alongside the Egyptian forces against the Babylonians until a crushing defeat at the Battle of Carchemish in 605 BCE. Though Assyrian culture endured through the subsequent post-imperial period and beyond, Aššur-uballiṭ's final defeat at Harran marked the end of the dynasty and of Assyria as a state.

== Reasons for the fall of Assyria ==
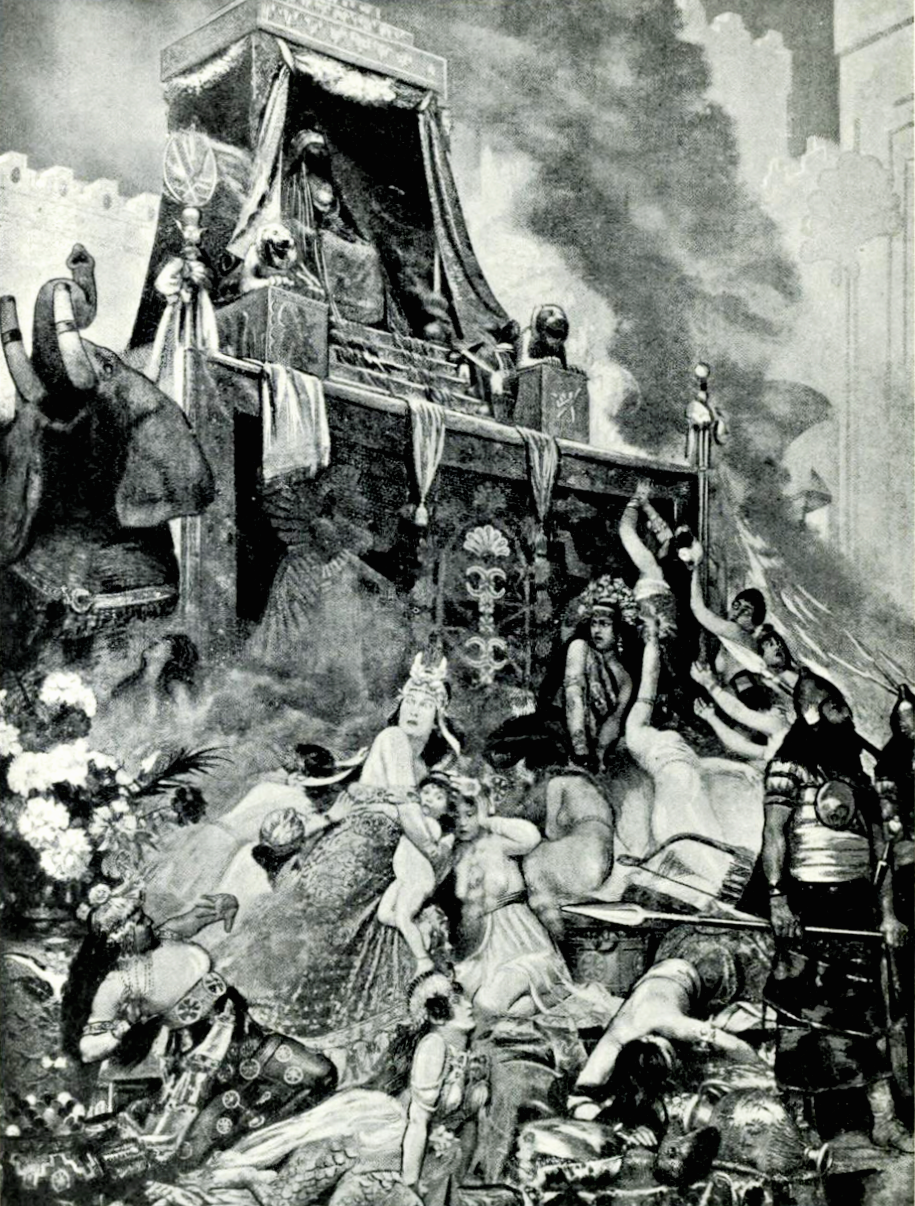
20th-century illustration of the Fall of Nineveh

The fall of Assyria was swift, dramatic and unexpected; scholars continue to grapple with what factors caused the empire's quick and violent downfall. One commonly cited possible explanation is the unrest and the civil wars that immediately preceded Nabopolassar's rise. Such civil conflict could have caused a crisis of legitimacy, and the members of the Assyrian elite may have felt increasingly disconnected from the Assyrian king. However, there is no evidence that Aššur-etil-ilāni and Sîn-šar-iškun warred with each other, and other uprisings of Assyrian officials—the unrest upon Aššur-etil-ilāni's accession, the rebellion of Sîn-šumu-līšir, and the capture of Nineveh by a usurper in 622 BCE—were dealt with relatively quickly. Protracted civil war is thus unlikely to have been the reason for the empire's fall.

Another proposed explanation was that Assyrian rule suffered from serious structural vulnerabilities; most importantly, Assyria appears to have had little to offer the regions it conquered other than order and freedom from strife; conquered lands were mostly kept in line through fear and terror, alienating local peoples. As such, people outside of the Assyrian heartland may have had little reason to remain loyal when the empire came under attack. Further explanations may lie in the actions and policies of the Assyrian kings. Under Esarhaddon's reign, many experienced and capable officials and generals had been killed as the result of the king's paranoia; under Ashurbanipal, many had lost their positions to eunuchs. Some historians have further deemed Ashurbanipal to have been an "irresponsible and self-indulgent king" since he at one point appointed his chief musician the name of the year. Though it would be easy to place the blame on Sîn-šar-iškun, there is no evidence to suggest that he was an incompetent ruler. No defensive plan existed for the Assyrian heartland since it had not been invaded for centuries, and Sîn-šar-iškun was a capable military leader using well-established Mesopotamian military tactics. In a normal war, Sîn-šar-iškun could have been victorious, but he was unprepared to go on the defensive against an enemy that was both numerically superior and that aimed to destroy his country rather than conquer it.

Yet another possible factor was environmental issues. The massive population growth in the Assyrian heartland at the height of the empire might have led to a severe drought that affected Assyria far more than nearby territories such as Babylonia. It is impossible to determine the severity of such demographic and climate-related effects.

A large reason for the Assyrian collapse was the failure to resolve the 'Babylonian problem', which had plagued kings since Assyria first conquered southern Mesopotamia. Despite the many attempts of the kings of the Sargonid dynasty to resolve the constant rebellions in the south in a variety of different ways—Sennacherib's destruction of Babylon and Esarhaddon's restoration of it—rebellions and insurrections remained common. This is despite Babylon for the most part being treated more leniently than other conquered regions. Babylonia was for instance not annexed directly into Assyria but preserved as a full kingdom, either ruled by an appointed client king or by the Assyrian king in a personal union. Despite the privileges the Assyrians saw themselves as extending to the Babylonians, Babylon refused to be passive in political matters, likely because the Babylonians saw the Assyrian kings—who rarely visited the city—as failing to undertake the traditional religious duties of the Babylonian kings. The strong appreciation of Babylonian culture in Assyria sometimes turned to hatred, which led to Babylon suffering several brutal acts of retribution from Assyrian kings after revolts. Nabopolassar's revolt was the last in a long line of Babylonian uprisings against the Assyrians; Sîn-šar-iškun's failure to stop it, despite trying for years, doomed his empire. Despite all of these simultaneous factors, it is possible that the empire could have survived if the unexpected alliance between the Babylonians and Medes had not been sealed.

== Government ==
=== Kingship and royal ideology ===
Sennacherib, the great king, the mighty king, king of the Universe, king of Assyria, king of the Four Corners of the World; favorite of the great gods; the wise and crafty one; strong hero, first among all princes; the flame that consumes the insubmissive, who strikes the wicked with the thunderbolt.

— Excerpt from the royal titles of Sennacherib (r. 705–681 BCE)

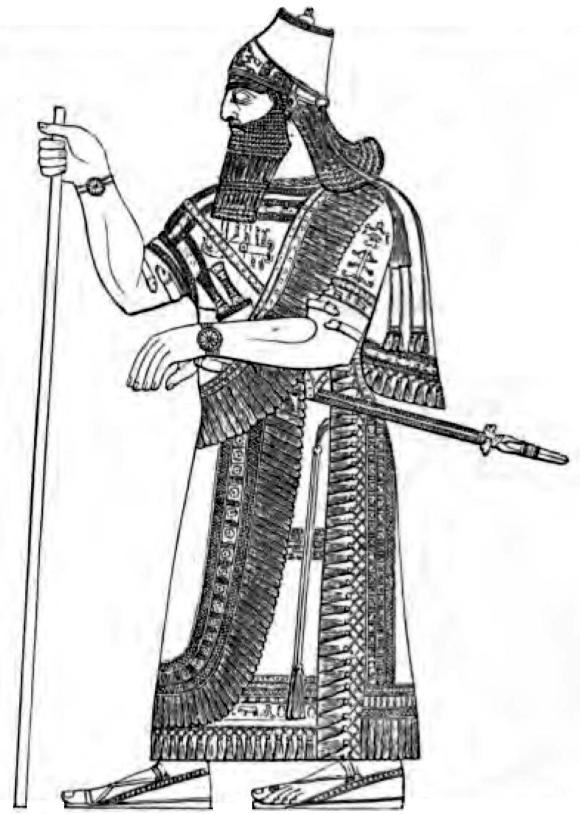
Line-drawing of a relief from Nimrud depicting a Neo-Assyrian king

In documents describing coronations of kings from both the Middle and Neo-Assyrian periods, it is specifically recorded that he was commanded by Aššur, the national deity of Assyria and whose favored city was also called Aššur, to "broaden the land of Aššur" and "extend the land at his feet". The Assyrians saw their empire as being the part of the world Aššur oversaw and administered through human agents. In their ideology, the realm beyond Assyria was characterized by chaos and uncivilised people with unfamiliar cultural practices and strange languages. The existence of the "outer realm" was regarded as a threat to the cosmic order within Assyria, and as such it was the king's duty to expand the realm of Aššur, Assyria, and incorporate these strange lands, converting chaos to civilization.

The king's position above all others was regarded as natural, since he, though not divine, was seen as the divinely-appointed representative of Aššur on earth. His power thus derived from his unique position among humanity, and his obligation to extend Assyria to eventually cover the whole world was cast as a moral, humane and necessary duty rather than exploitative imperialism. Though their power was nearly limitless, the kings were not free from tradition and their obligations. The kings were obliged to campaign once a year to bring Aššur's rule and civilization to 'the Four Corners' (the entire world); if a king did not campaign, their legitimacy was severely undermined. Campaigns were usually justified through an enemy having made a real or fabricated affront against Aššur. The overwhelming force of the Assyrian army was used to instill the idea that it was invincible, thus further legitimizing the king's rule. The king was also responsible for performing various rituals in support of the cult of Aššur and his priesthood.

Because the rule and actions of the king were seen as divinely sanctioned, resistance to Assyrian sovereignty in times of war was regarded to be resistance against divine will, which deserved punishment. Peoples and polities who revolted against Assyria were seen as criminals against the divine world order.

The legitimacy of the king hinged on acceptance among the imperial elite, and to a lesser extent, the wider populace, of the idea that the king was both divinely chosen by Aššur and uniquely qualified for his position. Various methods of legitimization were employed by the Neo-Assyrian kings and their royal courts. One of the common methods, which appears to be a new innovation of the Neo-Assyrian Empire, was the manipulation and codifying of the king's own personal history in the form of annals. This genre of texts is believed to have been created to support the king's legitimacy through recording events of their reign, particularly their military exploits. The annals were copied by scribes and disseminated throughout the empire for propagandistic purposes, reinforcing the perception of the king's power. In many cases, historical information was also inscribed on temples and other buildings. Kings also made use of genealogical legitimacy. Real (and, in some cases, perhaps fabricated) connections to past royalty established both uniqueness and authenticity, positioning the monarch as a descendant of great ancestors who, on behalf of Aššur, were responsible for creating and expanding civilization. Nearly all Neo-Assyrian kings highlighted their royal lineage in their inscriptions. Genealogical qualifications posed a problem for usurpers who did not belong to the direct lineage. The two Neo-Assyrian kings generally believed to have been usurpers, Tiglath-Pileser III and Sargon II, for the most part did not mention genealogical connections in their inscriptions, instead relying on direct divine appointment. Both of these kings claimed in several of their inscriptions that Aššur had "called my name" or "placed me on the throne".

=== Neo-Assyrian queens ===
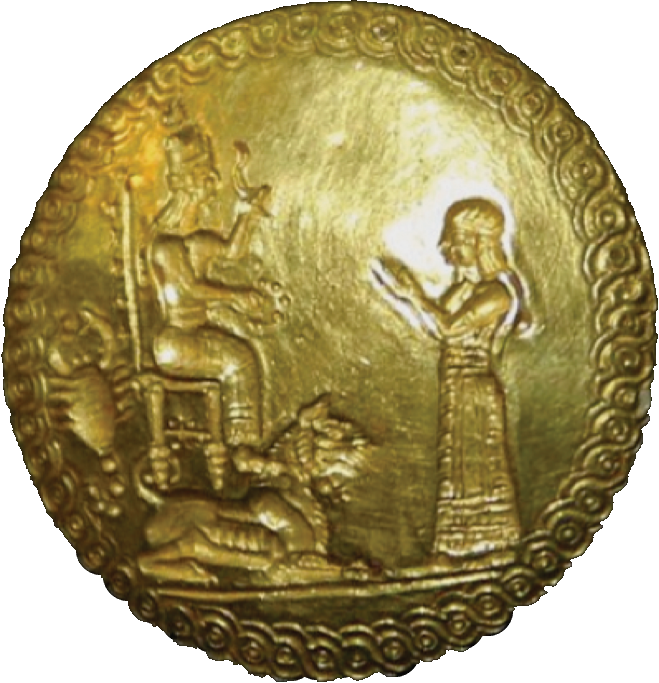
Seal of Hama, queen of Shalmaneser IV.

Queens were titled issi ekalli in the Assyrian variety of the Akkadian language, which could be abbreviated sēgallu, both terms meaning "woman of the palace". The feminine version of the word for king (šarru) was šarratu, but this term was only applied to goddesses and queens of foreign nations who ruled in their own right as queens regnant. Since queen consorts did not rule, the Assyrians did not refer to them as šarratu. The difference in terminology does not necessarily mean that foreign queens, who often governed significantly smaller territories, were seen as having a higher status than the Assyrian queens. A frequently used symbol, apparently the royal symbol of the queens, used in documents and on objects to designate the queens was a scorpion.

Though the queens, like all other members of the royal court, whether male or female, ultimately derived their power and influence from their association with the king, they were not pawns without political power. The queens had their own say in financial affairs, and while they ideally were supposed to produce an heir to the throne, they also had several other duties and responsibilities, often at very high levels of the government. The queens were involved in the organization of religious activities, the dedication of gifts to the gods, and the financial support of temples. They were in charge of their own, often considerable, financial resources, as evidenced not only by surviving texts concerning their household and activities but also by the treasures uncovered in the Queens' tombs at Nimrud. Under the Sargonid dynasty, military units subservient to the queen were created. Such units were not just an honor guard for the queen, but included commanders, cohorts of infantry and chariots and are sometimes known to have partaken alongside other units in military campaigns.

Perhaps the most powerful of the Neo-Assyrian queens was Shammuramat, queen of Shamshi-Adad V, who might have ruled as regent in the early reign of her son Adad-nirari III and participated in military campaigns. The mythical queen Semiramis was based on her. Also powerful was Esarhaddon's mother Naqiʾa, though whether she held the status of queen is not certain. Naqiʾa is the best documented woman of the Neo-Assyrian period, and she is seen influencing politics in the reigns of Sennacherib, Esarhaddon and Ashurbanipal.

=== Elite and administration ===
The unprecedented success of the Neo-Assyrian Empire was tied to its ability to efficiently incorporate conquered lands into its administrative system. It is clear that there was a strong sense of order in the Assyrian mindset, so much so that the Neo-Assyrians have sometimes been referred to as the "Prussians of the ancient Near East". This sense of order manifested in various parts of Neo-Assyrian society, including the more square and regular shape of the characters in Neo-Assyrian writing and in the organized administration of the Neo-Assyrian Empire, which was divided into a set of provinces. The idea of imposing order by creating well-organized hierarchies of power was part of the justifications used by Neo-Assyrian kings for their expansionism: in one of his inscriptions, Sargon II explicitly pointed out that some of the Arab tribes he had defeated had previously "known no overseer or commander".

At the top of the provincial administration was the provincial governor (bēl pīhāti or šaknu). Second-in-command was probably the šaniu (translated as "deputy" by modern historians, the title literally means "second") and at the bottom of the hierarchy were village managers (rab ālāni), in charge of one or more villages or other settlements with the primary duty to collect taxes in the form of labor and goods. Provincial governors were directly responsible for various aspects of provincial administration, including construction, taxation and security. Security concerns were often mostly relevant only in the frontier provinces, whose governors were also responsible for gathering intelligence about enemies across the border. To this end, a vast network of informants or spies (daiālu) were employed to keep officials informed of events and developments in foreign lands.

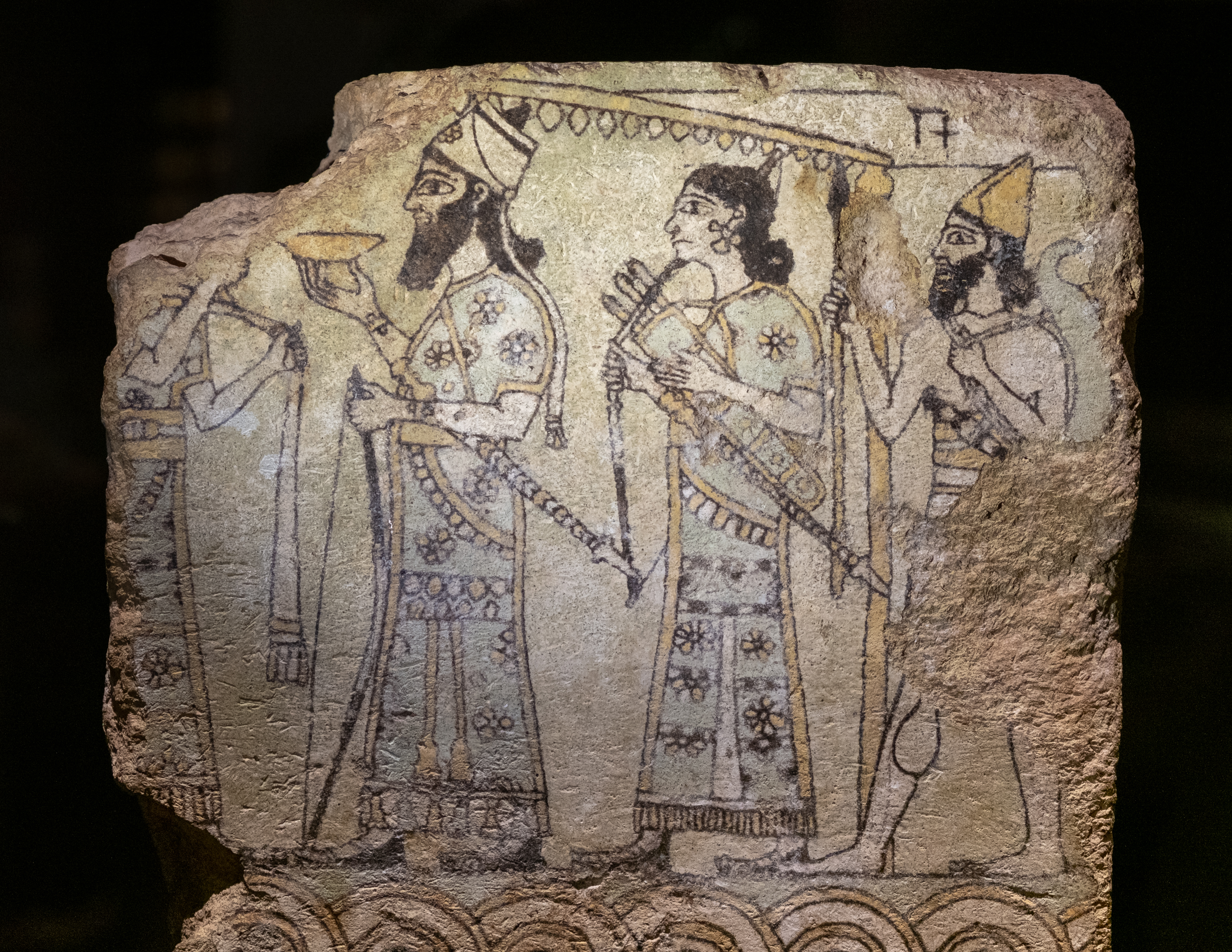
Glazed tile from Nimrud depicting a Neo-Assyrian king, accompanied by attendants

Provincial governors were also responsible for supplying offerings to temples, in particular to the temple of Ashur. This channeling of revenues from across the empire was not only meant as a method to collect profit but also as a way to connect the elites across the empire to the religious institutions in the Assyrian heartland. The royal administration kept close watch of institutions and individual officials across the empire through a system of officials responsible directly to the king, called qēpu (usually translated as "royal delegates"). Control was maintained locally through regularly deploying low-ranking officials to the smaller settlements, i.e. villages and towns, of the empire. Corvée officers (ša bēt-kūdini) kept tallies on the labor performed by forced laborers and the remaining time owed and village managers kept provincial administrators informed of the conditions of the settlements in their provinces. As the empire grew and time went on, many of its foreign subject peoples became incorporated into the Assyrian administration, with more high officials in the later times of the empire being of non-Assyrian origin.

The inner elite included two main groups, the "magnates" and the "scholars". The "magnates" are a grouping by modern historians for the seven highest-ranking officials in the administration; the masennu (treasurer), nāgir ekalli (palace herald), rab šāqê (chief cupbearer), rab ša-rēši (chief officer/eunuch), sartinnu (chief judge), sukkallu (grand vizier) and turtanu (commander-in-chief). These offices were sometimes occupied by members of the royal family. Occupants of four of the offices—the masennu, nāgir ekalli, rab šāqê and turtanu—served as governors of important provinces and thus as controllers of local tax revenues and administration. All of the magnates were involved with the Assyrian military, each controlling significant numbers of forces, and they often owned large and tax-free estates. Such estates were scattered across the empire, likely to defuse the power of local provincial authorities and to tie the personal interest of the inner elite to the well-being of the entire empire. The "scholars", called ummânī, included people specialized in various disciplines, including scribal arts, medicine, exorcism, divination and astrology. Their role was chiefly to protect, advise and guide the kings through interpreting omens, which maintained the ritual purity of the king and protected him from evil.

=== State communications ===
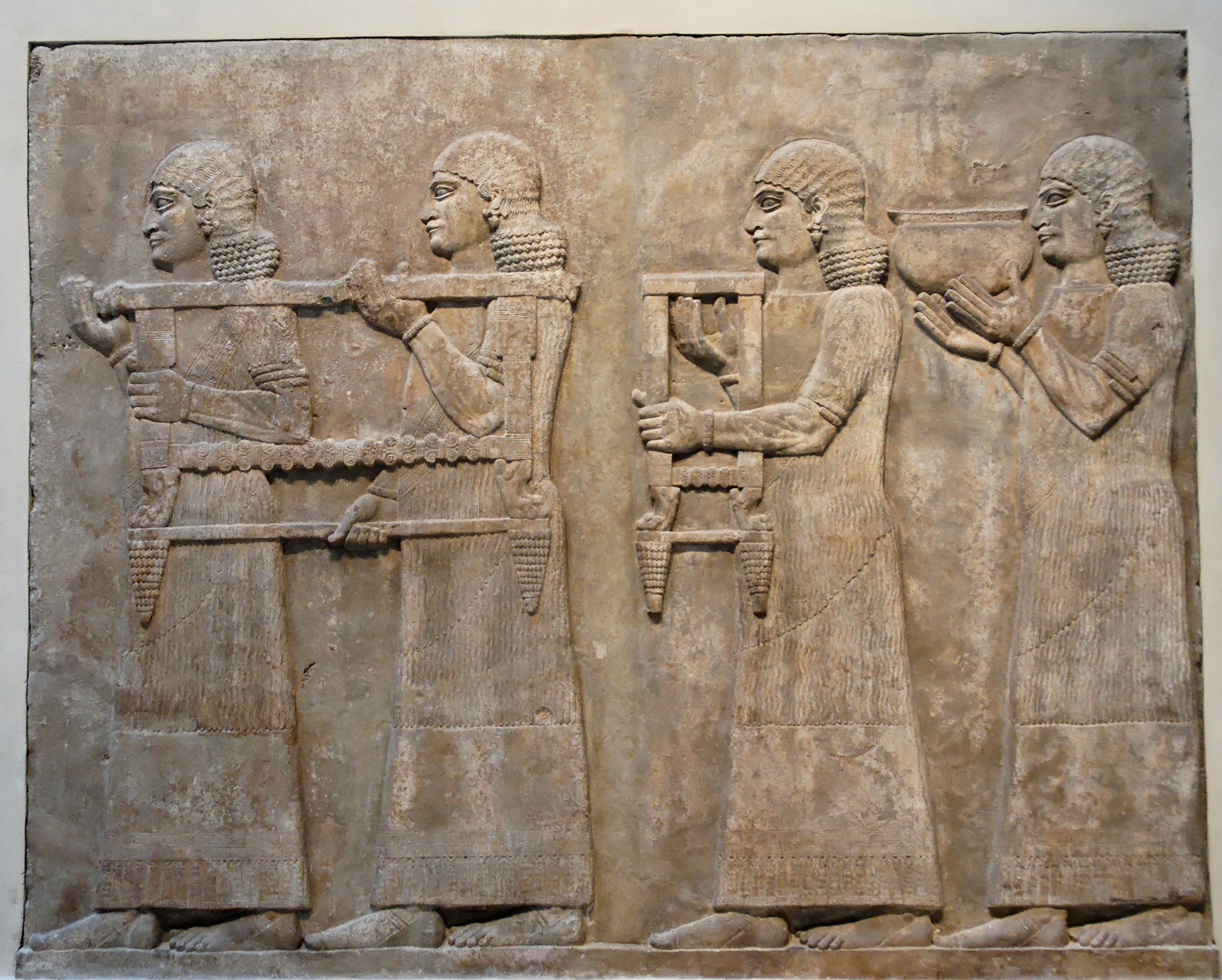
Neo-Assyrian relief depicting eunuchs carrying booty from a war

To govern an empire of unprecedented size, the Neo-Assyrian Empire, probably first under Shalmaneser III, developed a sophisticated state communication system. Use of this system was restricted to messages sent by high officials; their messages were stamped with their seals, which demonstrated their authority. Messages without such seals could not be sent through the communication system.

Per estimates by Karen Radner, a message sent from the western border province Quwê to the Assyrian heartland, a distance of 700 kilometers (430 miles) over a stretch of lands featuring many rivers without any bridges, could take less than five days to arrive. Such communication speed was unprecedented before the rise of the Neo-Assyrian Empire and was not surpassed in the Middle East until the telegraph was introduced by the Ottoman Empire in 1865, nearly 2,500 years later. The quick communications between the imperial court and officials in the provinces was an important contributing factor to the cohesion of the empire and an important innovation which paved the way for its geopolitical dominance.

The government used mules for long-distance state messengers because of their strength, hardiness and low maintenance. Assyria was the first civilization to use mules for this purpose. It was common for messengers to ride with two mules, which meant that it was possible to alternate between them to keep them fresh and to ensure that the messengers were not stranded if one mule became lame. Messages were sent either through a trusted envoy or through a series of relay riders. The relay system, called kalliu, was invented by the Assyrians and allowed for significantly faster speeds in times of need, with each rider only covering a segment of the travel route, ending at a relay station at which the next rider, with a fresh pair of mules, was passed the letter. To facilitate transport and long-distance travel, the empire constructed and maintained a vast road system. Called the hūl šarri ("king's road"), the roads might originally have grown from routes used by the military during campaigns and were continually expanded. The largest phase of road expansion transpired between the reigns of Shalmaneser III and Tiglath-Pileser III.

== Military ==
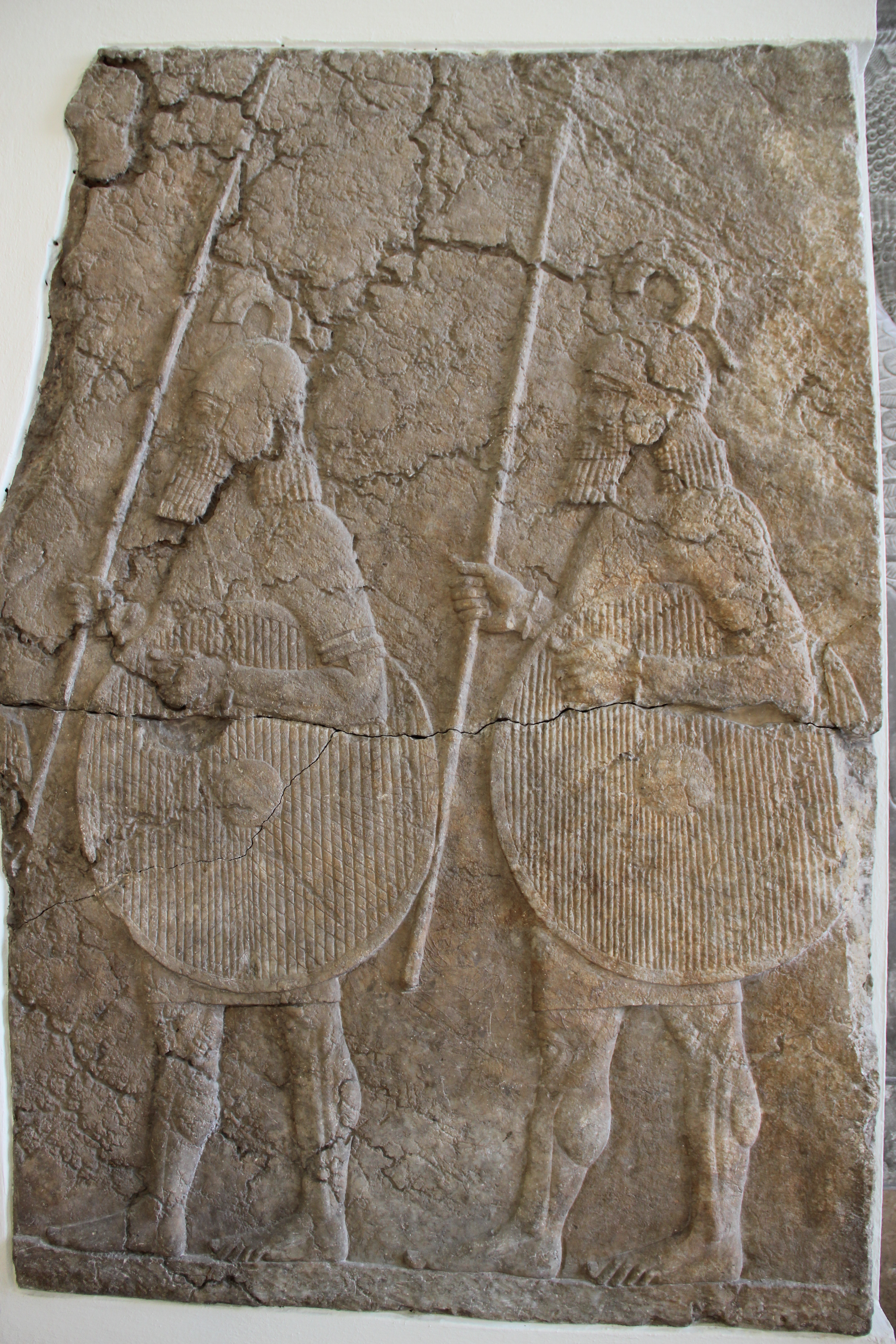
Relief from Sennacherib's palace at Nineveh depicting two Assyrian spearmen

At the height of the empire, the Assyrian army was the strongest army yet assembled in world history. The number of soldiers was likely several hundred thousand. The Assyrians pioneered innovative strategies, particularly concerning cavalry and siege warfare, that would be used in warfare for millennia. Due to detailed royal records and detailed depictions of soldiers and battle scenes on reliefs, the equipment and organization of the army is relatively well understood. Communication within the army and between units was fast and efficient; using the empire's efficient methods of state communication, messages could be sent across vast distances very quickly. Messages could be passed within an army through the use of fire signals.

While on campaign, the army was symbolically led by two gods; with standards of Nergal and Adad being hoisted to the left and right of the commander. The commander was typically the king, but other officials could be assigned to lead the army into war. The army was chiefly raised through provincial governors levying troops. Provincial governors sometimes led campaigns and negotiated with foreign rulers. Under the Sargonid dynasty, some reforms appear to have been made to the leadership of armies; the office of turtanu was divided into two, and it seems that specific regiments, including their respective land-holdings, were transferred from the king's direct command to the command of the crown prince and the queen. The two most important developments in the Neo-Assyrian period were the large-scale introduction of cavalry and the adoption of iron for armor and weapons.

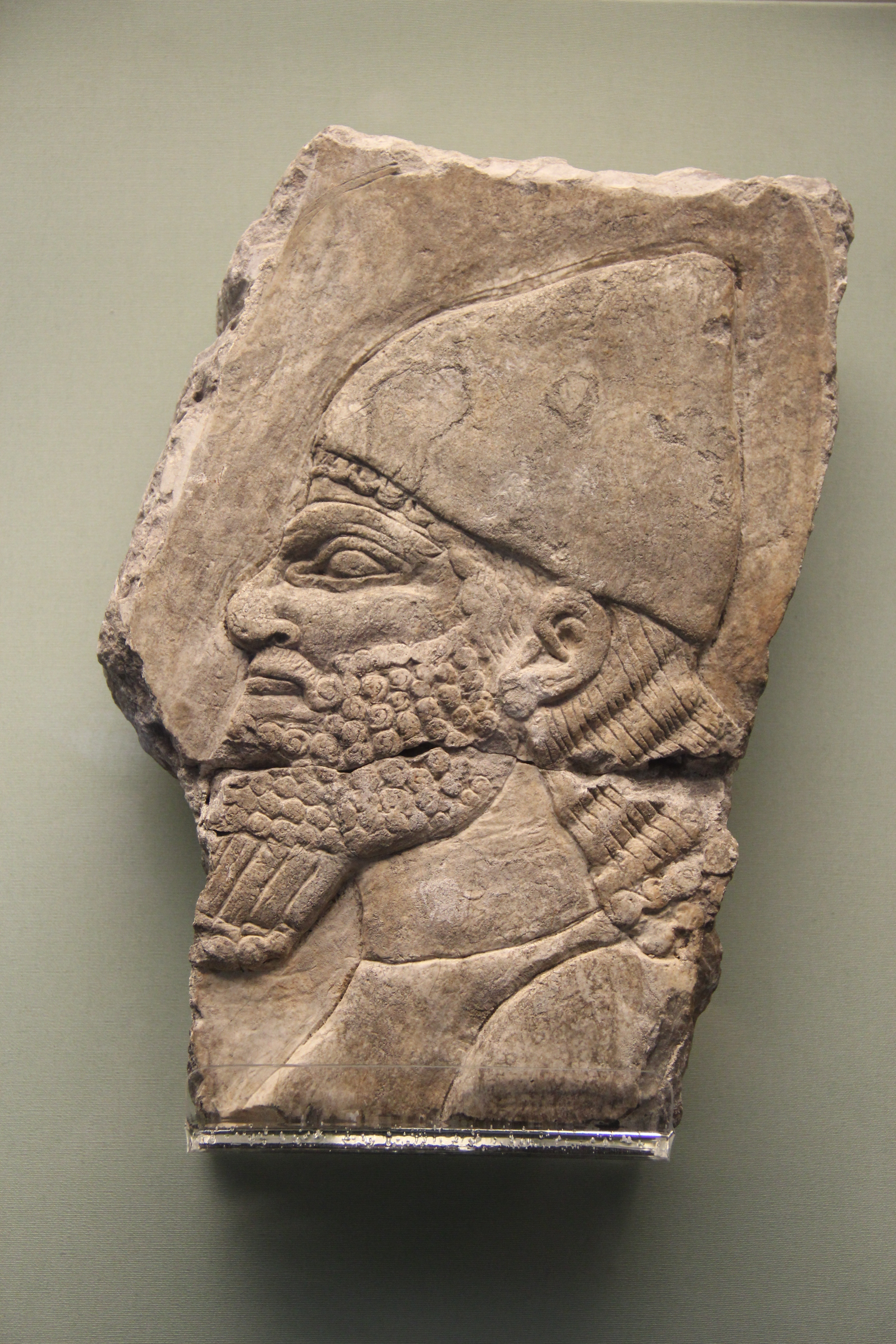
Relief of a Neo-Assyrian soldier, 900–600 BCE, Nimrud

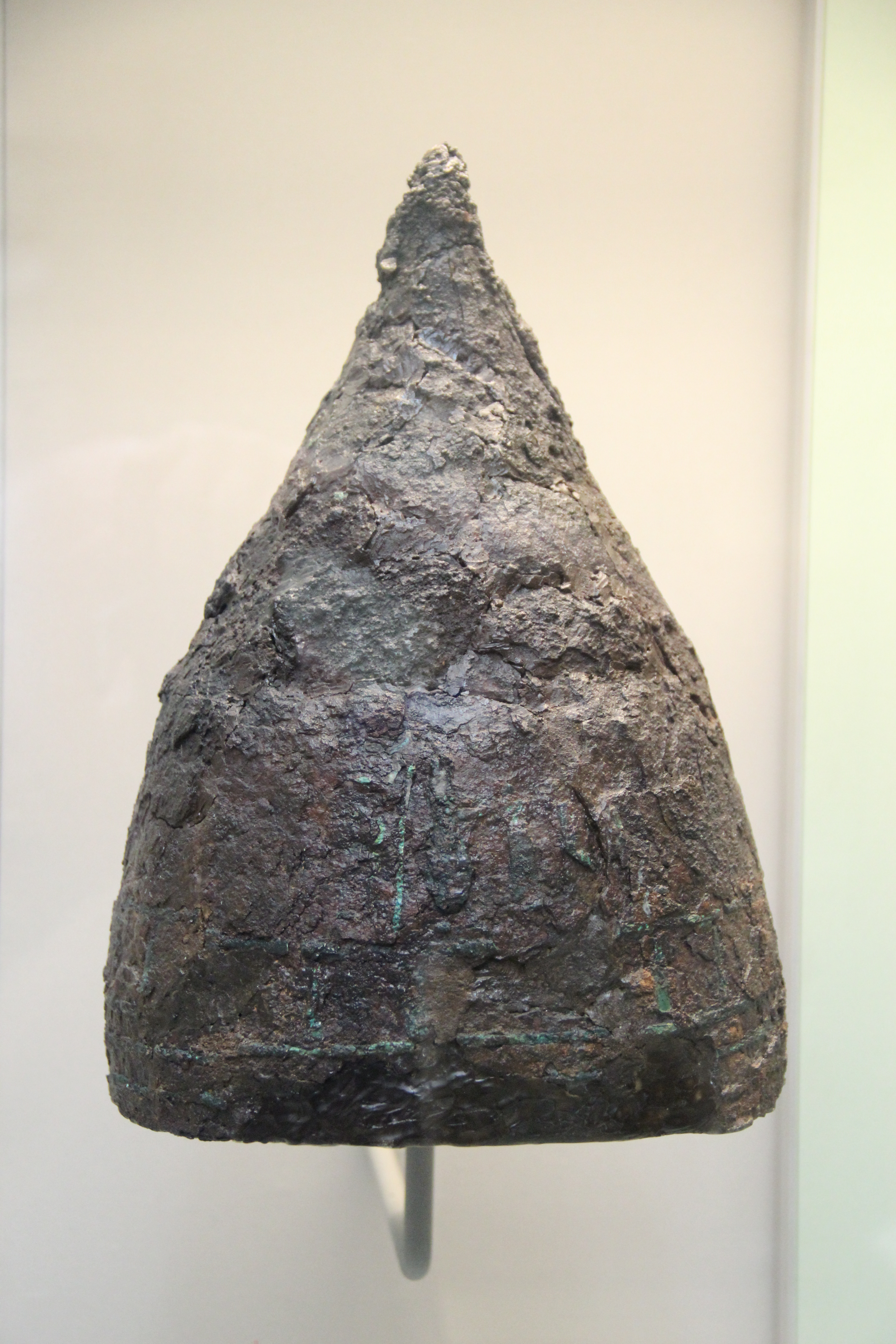
Neo-Assyrian iron helmet, Nimrud, 800–700 BCE

While the Middle Assyrian army had been composed entirely of levies, a central standing army was established in the Neo-Assyrian Empire, dubbed the kiṣir šarri ("king's unit"). Closely accompanying the king were the ša qurubte, or royal bodyguards, some drawn from the infantry. The army was subdivided into kiṣru, composed of perhaps 1,000 soldiers, most of whom would have been infantry soldiers (zūk, zukkû or raksūte). The infantry was divided into three types: light, medium and heavy. The light infantry might have in addition to serving in battles also carried out policing tasks and served in garrisons and was likely mainly composed of Aramean tribesmen, often barefoot and without helmets, wielding bows or spears. Also included in that group were probably expert archers hired from Elam. The medium infantry were also primarily archers or spearmen but were armed with characteristic pointed helmets and a shield, though no body armor was used before the time of Ashurbanipal. The heavy infantry included spearmen, archers and slingers and wore boots, pointed helmets, round shields and scale armor. In battle they fought in close formation. Foreign levy troops drafted into the army are often distinguishable in reliefs by distinct headgear.

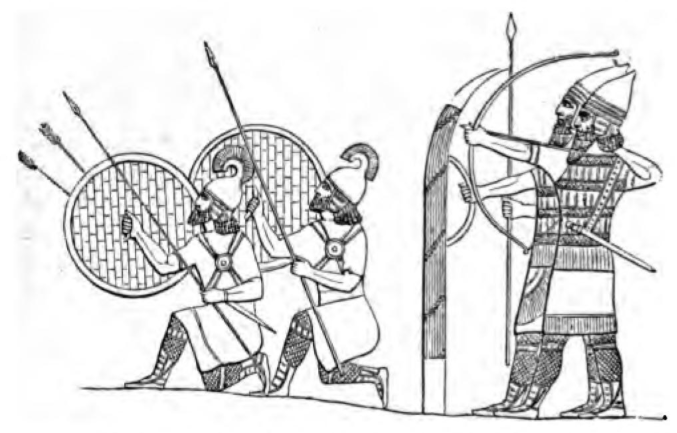
Line-drawing of a Neo-Assyrian relief showing soldiers forming a phalanx

The cavalry (ša pētḫalli) used small horses bred in northern Assyria. The cavalry was commanded by a general with the title rab muggi ša pētḫalli. The cavalry was at some point divided into two distinct groups; the archers (ṣāb qašti) and lancers (ṣāb kabābi), both of whom were also equipped with swords. The army incorporated foreign cavalry from Urartu, despite Assyria and Urartu often being at war. The role of cavalry changed through the Neo-Assyrian period; early on, cavalrymen worked in pairs, one shooting arrows and the other protecting the bowman with his shield. Later on, shock cavalry was introduced. Under Ashurbanipal, horses were equipped with leather armor and a bronze plaque on the head, and riders wore scale armor. Though chariots continued to be used ceremonially and were often used by kings while on campaign, they were largely replaced by cavalry as a prominent element of the army.

While on campaign, the army made heavy use of both interpreters/translators (targumannu) and guides (rādi kibsi), both probably being drawn from foreigners resettled in Assyra. The innovative techniques and siege engines in siege warfare included tunneling, diverting rivers, blockading to ensure starvation, siege towers, ladders, ramps and battering rams. Another innovation were the camps established by the army while on campaign, which were carefully designed with collapsible furniture and tents so that they could be swiftly built and dismantled.

== Society ==
=== Population ===
==== Social classes, hierarchy and economy ====
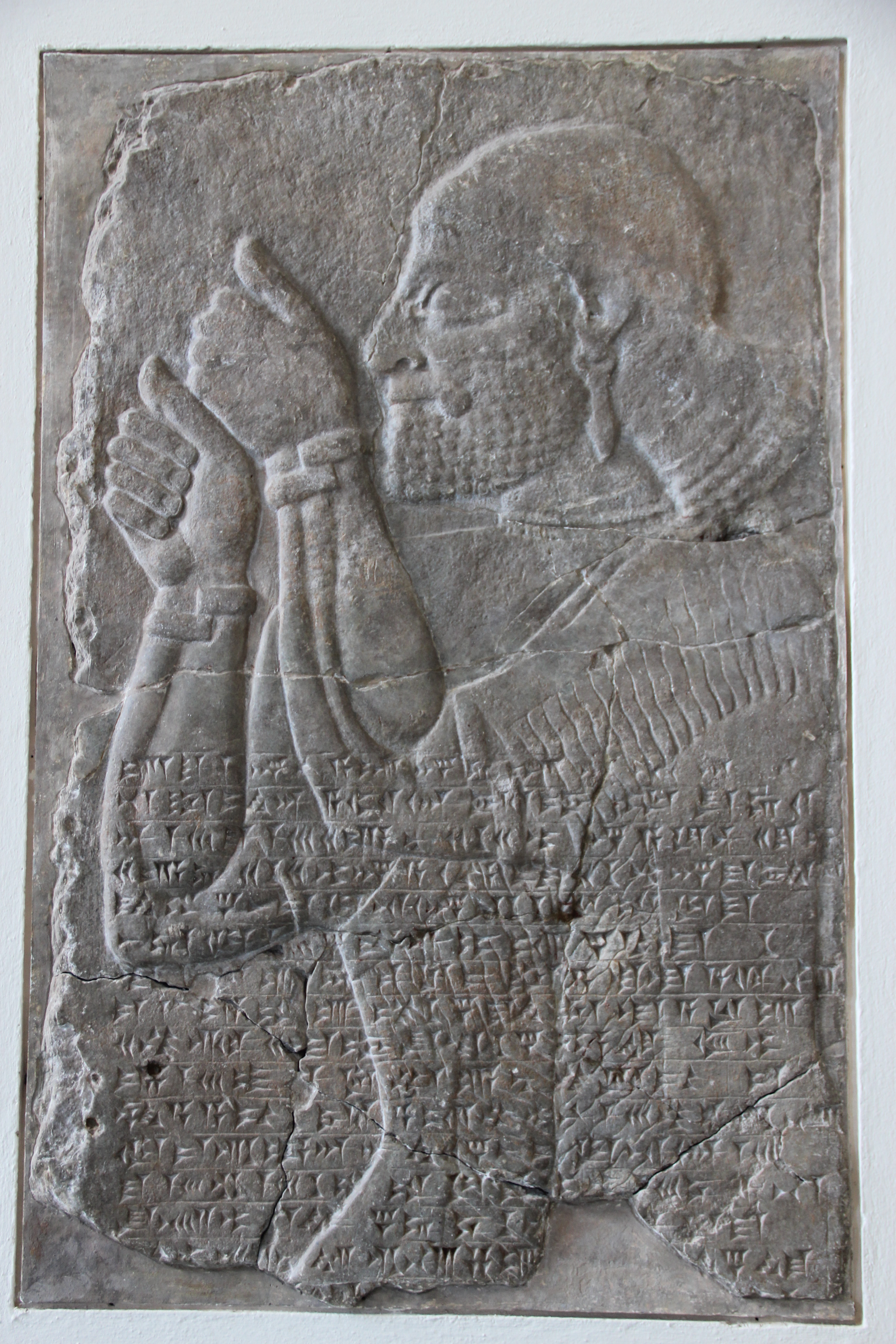
Neo-Assyrian relief from Nimrud depicting a tribute-bearer

At the top of society was the king. Below the king were (in descending order of prestige and power) the crown prince, the royal family, the royal court, administrators and army officers. From the time Ashurnasirpal II designated Nimrud as the new capital of the empire onwards, eunuchs held a high position. The highest offices both in the civil administration and the army were typically occupied by eunuchs with deliberately obscure and lowly origins, since this ensured that they would be loyal to the king. The members of the royal court were often handpicked from among the urban elites by eunuchs.

Below the higher classes were the Assyrian "citizens", (Note: For a lack of a better term; there was no corresponding ancient Assyrian term or clearly defined legal status.) semi-free laborers (usually mostly made up of deportees) and then slaves. There was not a large number of slaves, who were made up of prisoners of war and of Assyrians unable to pay their debts and were thus reduced to debt bondage. In many cases, Assyrian family groups or "clans" formed large population groups within the empire referred to as tribes. (Note: Not to be confused with modern Assyrian tribes) It was possible through steady service to the Assyrian state bureaucracy for a family to move up the social ladder; in some cases stellar work conducted by a single individual enhanced the status of their family for generations. Foreigners could also reach high positions with attestations of individuals with Aramean names in high positions by the end of the 8th century BCE. Though most of the preserved sources only give insight into the higher classes, the vast majority of the population would have been farmers who worked land owned by their families.

Families and tribes lived together in settlements near their agricultural lands. It is not clear how local settlements were organized internally beyond each being headed by a mayor who acted as a local judge (more in the sense of a counselor to involved parties than someone who passed judgement) and represented the settlement within the state bureaucracy. It is possible that the mayors were responsible for forwarding local concerns to the state; no revolts by the common people (only by local governors and high officials) are known. Though all means of production were owned by the state, there was a vibrant private economic sector within the empire, with property rights of individuals ensured by the government. Monumental construction projects were undertaken by the state through levying materials and people from local governors, though sometimes also with the help of private contractors.

The wealth generated through private investments was dwarfed by the wealth of the state, which was by far the largest employer in the empire and had an obvious monopoly on agriculture, manufacturing and exploitation of minerals. The imperial economy advantaged mainly the elite, since it was structured in a way that ensured that surplus wealth flowed to the government and was then used for the maintenance of the state throughout the empire.

==== Resettlement policy ====
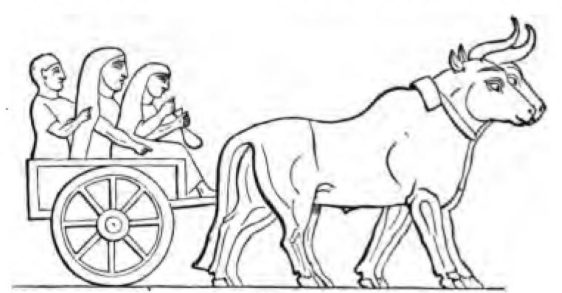
Line-drawing of a Neo-Assyrian relief depicting a family of deportees leaving a captured Babylonian city in an ox-cart

From the time of the reconquista onwards, the Assyrians made extensive use of an increasingly complex system of deportations and resettlements. Large-scale resettlement projects were carried out in recently defeated enemy lands and cities in an effort to destroy local identities, which would reduce the risk that local peoples rose up against Assyria, and to make the most of the empire's resources, through settling people in a specific underdeveloped region to cultivate its resources better. Though it could likely be emotionally devastating for the resettled populations and economically devastating for the regions they were drawn from, the policy did not include killing any of the resettled people and was meant to safeguard the empire and make its upkeep more efficient. The total number of relocated individuals has been estimated at 1.5–4.5 million people.

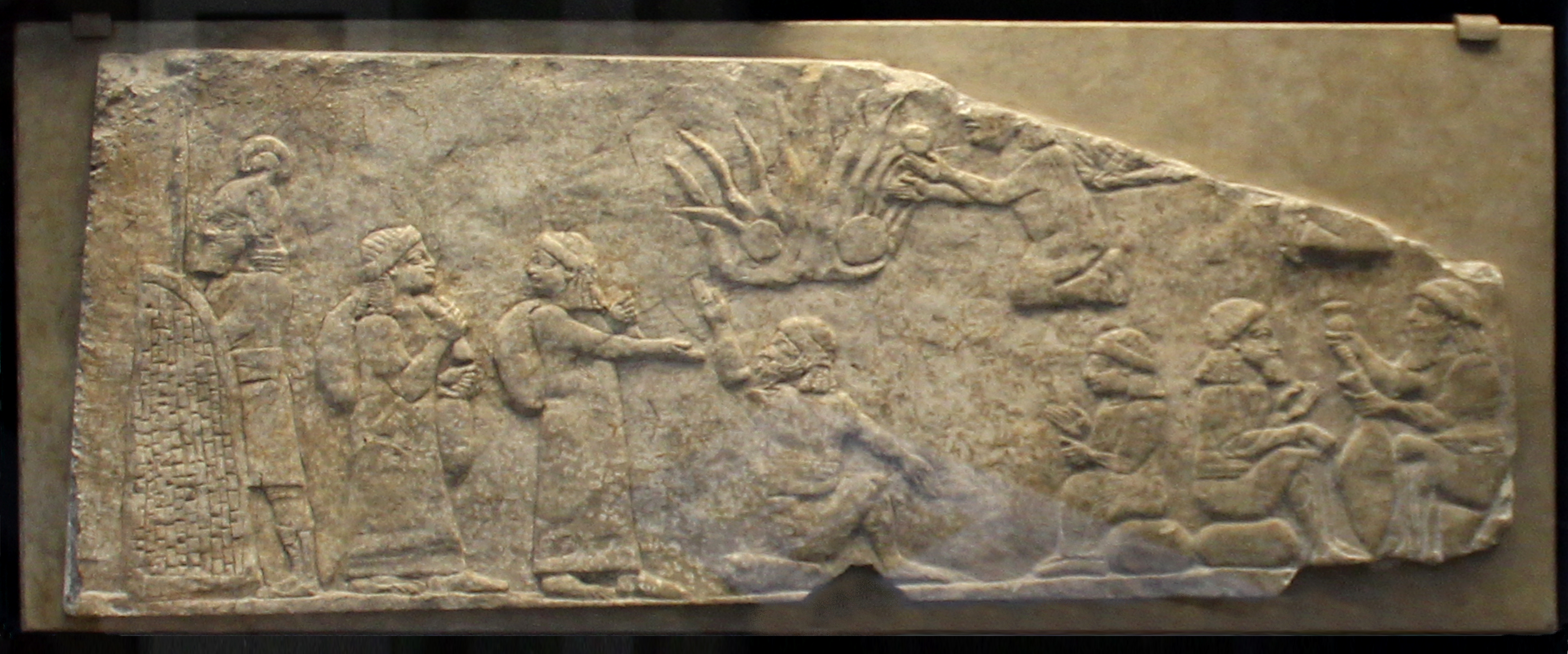
Relief from the time of Ashurbanipal, depicting Babylonian prisoners under Assyrian guard

The state valued deportees for their labor and abilities. One of the most important reasons for resettlement was to develop the empire's agricultural infrastructure through introducing Assyrian-developed agricultural techniques to all of the provinces. As a result, many regions of the empire experienced significant improvements in irrigation and thus prosperity.

The resettlements were carefully planned out and organized. Resettled people were allowed to bring their possessions with them, settle and live together with their families. They were no longer counted as foreigners but as Assyrians, which over time contributed to a sense of loyalty to the state. This recognition as Assyrians was not in name only, as documentary evidence attests to the new settlers not being treated any differently by the Assyrian state than the old populations who had lived in the same locations for generations.

A consequence of the resettlements, and according to Karen Radner "the most lasting legacy of the Assyrian Empire", was a dilution of the cultural diversity of the Near East, changing the region's ethnolinguistic composition and facilitating the rise of Aramaic as the local lingua franca. Aramaic remained the lingua franca of the region until suppression of Christians under the Ilkhanate and Timurid Empire in the 14th century AD.

=== Languages ===
==== Akkadian ====
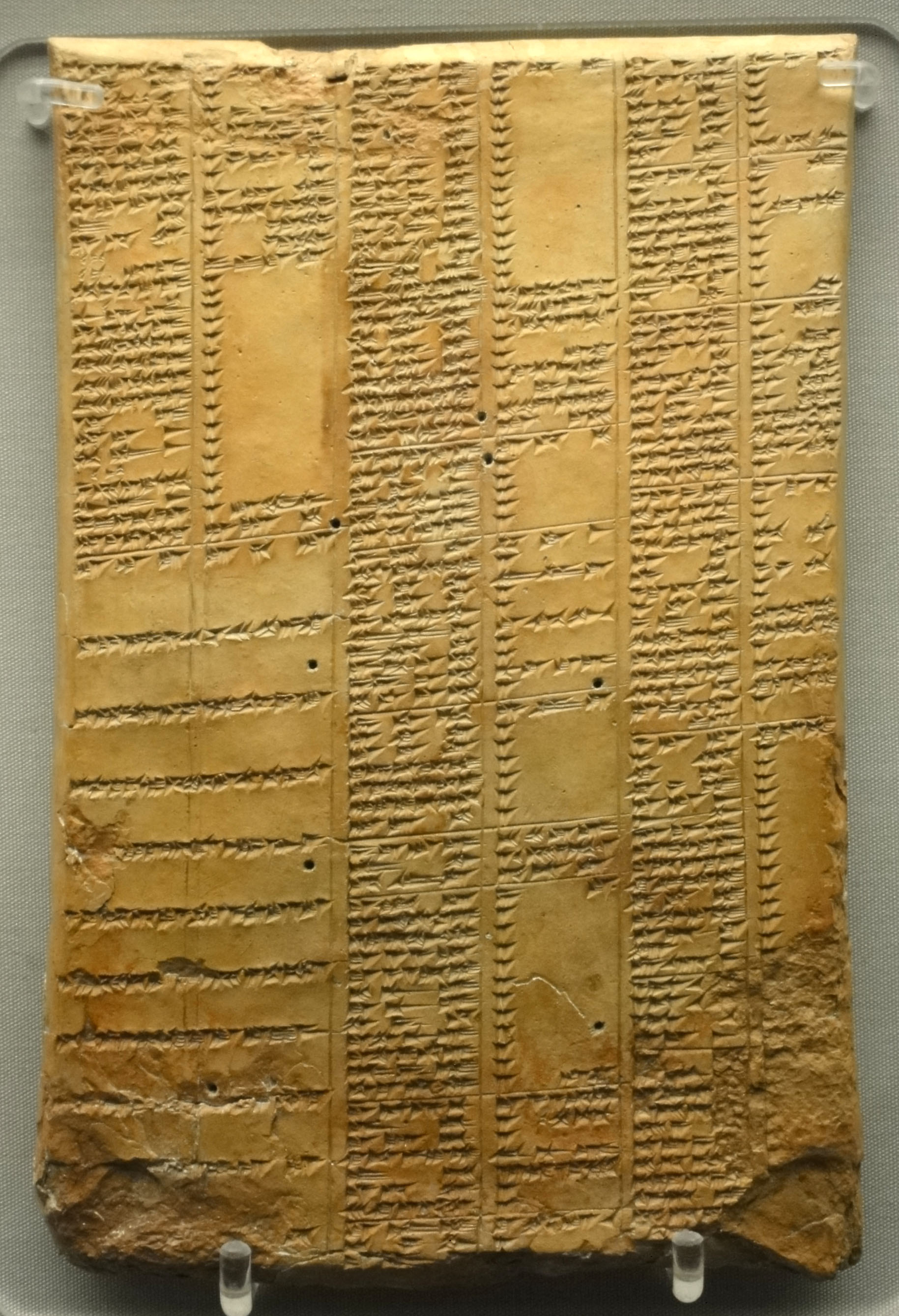
Neo-Assyrian cuneiform tablet from the Library of Ashurbanipal listing synonyms

The ancient Assyrians primarily spoke and wrote the Assyrian language, a Semitic language (i.e. related to modern Hebrew and Arabic) closely related to Babylonian, spoken in southern Mesopotamia. Assyrian and Babylonian are generally regarded by modern scholars as dialects of the Akkadian language. The empire was the last state to sponsor writing traditional Akkadian cuneiform in all levels of its administration. As a result, ancient Mesopotamian textual tradition and writing practices flourished to an unprecedented degree in the Neo-Assyrian period. Texts written in cuneiform were made not just in the traditionally Akkadian-speaking Assyrian heartland and Babylonia, but by officials and scribes all over the empire. At the height of the empire, cuneiform documents were written in lands today part of countries like Israel, Lebanon, Turkey, Syria, Jordan and Iran, which had not produced any cuneiform writings for centuries, and in cases never before.

Three distinct versions, or dialects, of Akkadian were used: Standard Babylonian, Neo-Assyrian and Neo-Babylonian. Standard Babylonian was a highly codified version of ancient Babylonian, used around 1500 BCE, and was used as a language of high culture, for nearly all scholarly documents, literature and poetry. The culture of the elite was strongly influenced by Babylonia in the south. Though the political relationship between Babylonia and the Assyrian central government was variable and volatile, cultural appreciation of the south was constant throughout the Neo-Assyrian period. Many of the documents written in Standard Babylonian were written by scribes who originally came from southern Mesopotamia but were employed in the north. The Neo-Assyrian and Neo-Babylonian forms of Akkadian were vernacular languages, primarily spoken in northern and southern Mesopotamia, respectively.

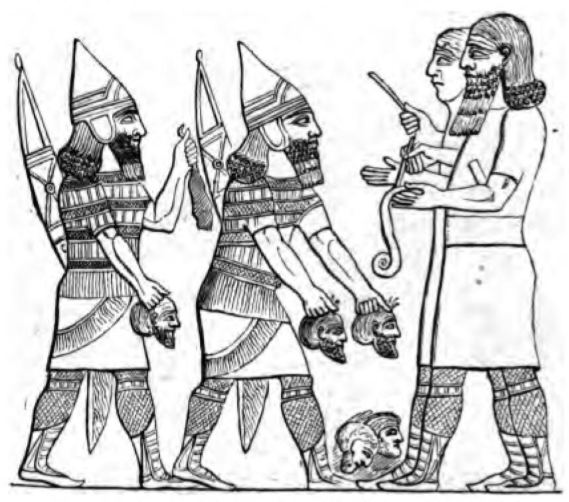
Line-drawing of a relief depicting Neo-Assyrian scribes recording the number of enemies slain by soldiers

==== Aramaic ====
The imperialism of the empire was in some ways different from that of later empires. The perhaps biggest difference was that the kings did not impose their religion or language on the foreign peoples they conquered outside the Assyrian heartland; the national deity Ashur had no significant temples outside of northern Mesopotamia, and the Neo-Assyrian language, though it served as an official language in the sense that it was spoken by provincial governors, was not forced upon conquered peoples. This lack of suppression against foreign languages, and the growing movement of Aramaic-speaking people into the empire during the Middle Assyrian and early Neo-Assyrian periods, facilitated the spread of the Aramaic language. Aramaic grew in importance and increasingly replaced the Neo-Assyrian language even within the Assyrian heartland. From the 9th century BCE onwards, Aramaic became the de facto lingua franca of the empire, with Neo-Assyrian and other forms of Akkadian becoming relegated to a language of the political elite.

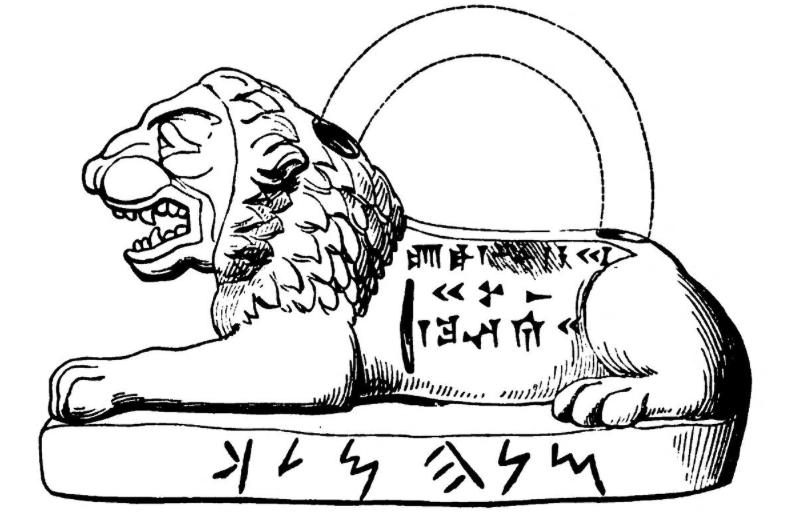
Line drawing of an Assyrian lion weight once belonging to the king Shalmaneser V (r. 727–722 BCE). The inscriptions on the weight are in both Akkadian (on the body) and Aramaic (on the base).

Despite its growth, surviving examples of Aramaic from Neo-Assyrian times are significantly fewer in number than Akkadian writings, mostly because Aramaic scribes for the most part used perishable materials for their writings. The somewhat lacking record of Aramaic in inscriptions does not reflect that the language held a lower status, since royal inscriptions were almost always written in a highly codified and established manner. Some Aramaic-language inscriptions in stone are known, and there are even a handful of examples of bilingual inscriptions, with the same text written in both Akkadian and Aramaic.

Despite the Neo-Assyrian Empire's promotion of Akkadian, Aramaic also grew to become a widespread vernacular language and it also began to be used in official state-related capacities as early as the reign of Shalmaneser III, given that some examples of Aramaic writings are known from a palace he built in Nimrud. The relationship between Akkadian and Aramaic was somewhat complex, however. Though Sargon II explicitly rejected Aramaic as being unfit for royal correspondence, (Note: One of Sargon's letters, written in response to an official from Ur in Babylonia who wished to write to the king in Aramaic, reads "Why would you not write and send me messages in Akkadian? Really, the message which you write must be drawn up in this very manner – this is a fixed regulation!".) Aramaic was an officially recognized language under his predecessor Shalmaneser V, who owned a set of lion weights inscribed with text in both Akkadian and Aramaic. That the question of using Aramaic in royal correspondence was even raised in Sargon II's time in the first place was a significant development. In reliefs from palaces built by kings from Tiglath-Pileser III to Ashurbanipal, scribes writing in Akkadian and Aramaic are often depicted side by side, confirming Aramaic having risen to the position of an official language used by the imperial administration.

==== Other languages ====
The Neo-Assyrian Empire was highly multilingual. Through its expansionism, the empire came to rule a vast stretch of land incorporating regions throughout the Near East, where various languages were spoken. These languages included various Semitic languages (including Phoenician, Hebrew, Arabic, Ugaritic, Moabite and Edomite) as well as many non-Semitic languages, such as Indo-European languages (including Luwian and Median), Hurrian languages (including Urartian and Shuprian), Afroasiatic languages (Egyptian), and language isolates (including Mannean and Elamite). Though it was no longer spoken, some scholarly texts from the Neo-Assyrian period were also written in the ancient Sumerian language. Though they must have been necessary, Neo-Assyrian texts rarely mentioned translators and interpreters (targumānu). Translators are only mentioned in cases when Assyrians communicated with speakers of non-Semitic languages.

=== Scholarship and engineering ===
==== Literature ====
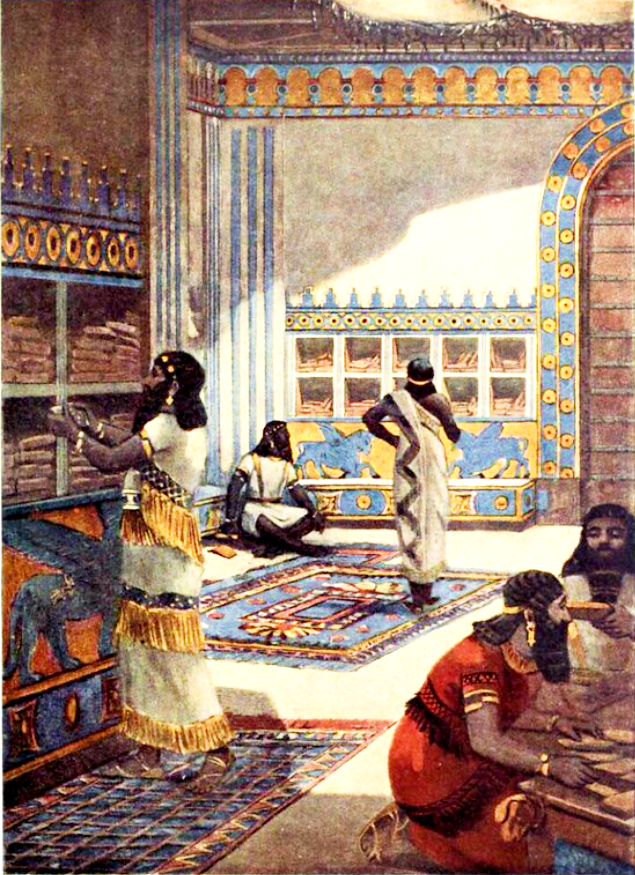
Reconstruction of the Library of Ashurbanipal

The beginnings of Assyrian scholarship is conventionally placed near the beginning of the Middle Assyrian Empire in the 14th century BCE, when Assyrians began to take a lively interest in Babylonian scholarship, which they adapted and developed into their own scholarship tradition. The rising status of scholarship might be connected to the kings beginning to regard amassing knowledge as a way to strengthen their power. There was a marked change in royal attitude towards scholarship; while the kings had previously seen preserving knowledge as a responsibility of the temples and of private individuals, it was increasingly also seen as a responsibility of the king. The scholarship appears to have begun already under Tukulti-Ninurta II in the 9th century BCE, since he is the first Assyrian king under which the office of chief scholar is attested. In Tukulti-Ninurta's time the office was occupied by Gabbu-ilani-eresh, an ancestor of a later influential family of advisors and scribes.

Libraries were built to maintain scribal culture and scholarship and to preserve the knowledge of the past. Such libraries were not limited to the temples and royal palaces; there were also private libraries built and kept by individual scholars. Texts found in the libraries fall into a wide array of genres, including divinatory texts, divination reports, treatments for the sick (either medical or magical), ritual texts, incantations, prayers and hymns, school texts and literary texts.

The largest and most important royal library in Mesopotamian history was the Library of Ashurbanipal, an ambitious project for which Ashurbanipal gathered tablets from both Assyrian and Babylonian libraries. The texts in this library were gathered both through amassing existing tablets from throughout the empire and through commissioning scribes to copy existing works in their own libraries and send them to the king. The Library of Ashurbanipal included more than 30,000 documents.

==== Civic technology ====
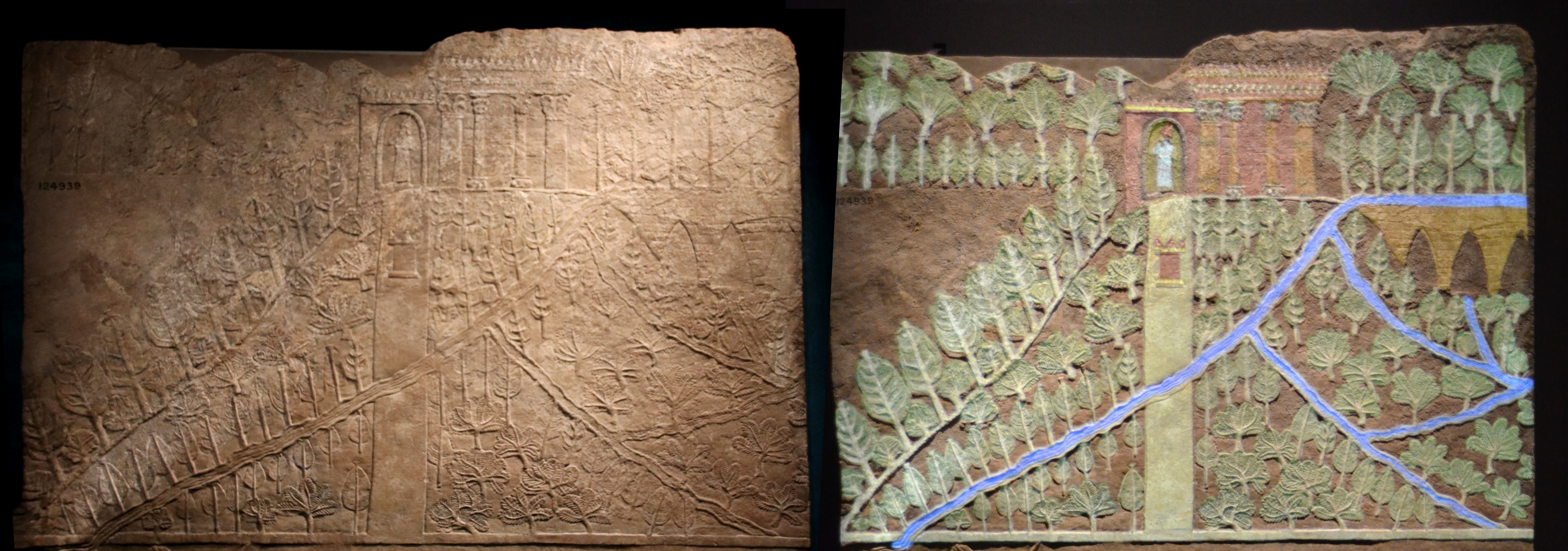
Relief depicting the gardens of Ashurbanipal in Nineveh (left) with a color reconstruction (right). As can be seen on the right side of the relief, the garden featured sophisticated irrigation aqueducts.

The empire accomplished several complex technical projects, which indicates sophisticated technical knowledge. Various professionals who performed engineering tasks are attested in Neo-Assyrian sources, such as individuals holding positions like šitimgallu ("chief builder"), šellapajū ("architect"), etinnu ("house builder") and gugallu ("inspector of canals").

Among the most impressive engineering and construction projects were the repeated constructions and renovations of capital cities (Nimrud, Dur-Sharrukin and Nineveh). Royal inscriptions commemorating the building works at these sites often detail the building process. The level of sophistication in engineering is evident from solutions to technical problems like lighting throughout large buildings and canalizations of toilets, roofs and courts. A frequent challenge was to construct the roofs of large rooms since the Assyrians had to support them using only wooden beams. As a result, large representative rooms were often much longer than they were wide.

There was a general tendency of kings wanting to outperform their predecessors: Sennacherib's palace at Nineveh was significantly larger than that of Sargon II, which in turn was significantly larger than that of Shalmaneser III. All the capitals contained great parks, an innovation of the Neo-Assyrian period. Parks were complex engineering works since they not only exhibited exotic plants from far-away lands but also involved modifying the landscape through adding artificial hills and ponds, as well as pavilions and other small buildings.

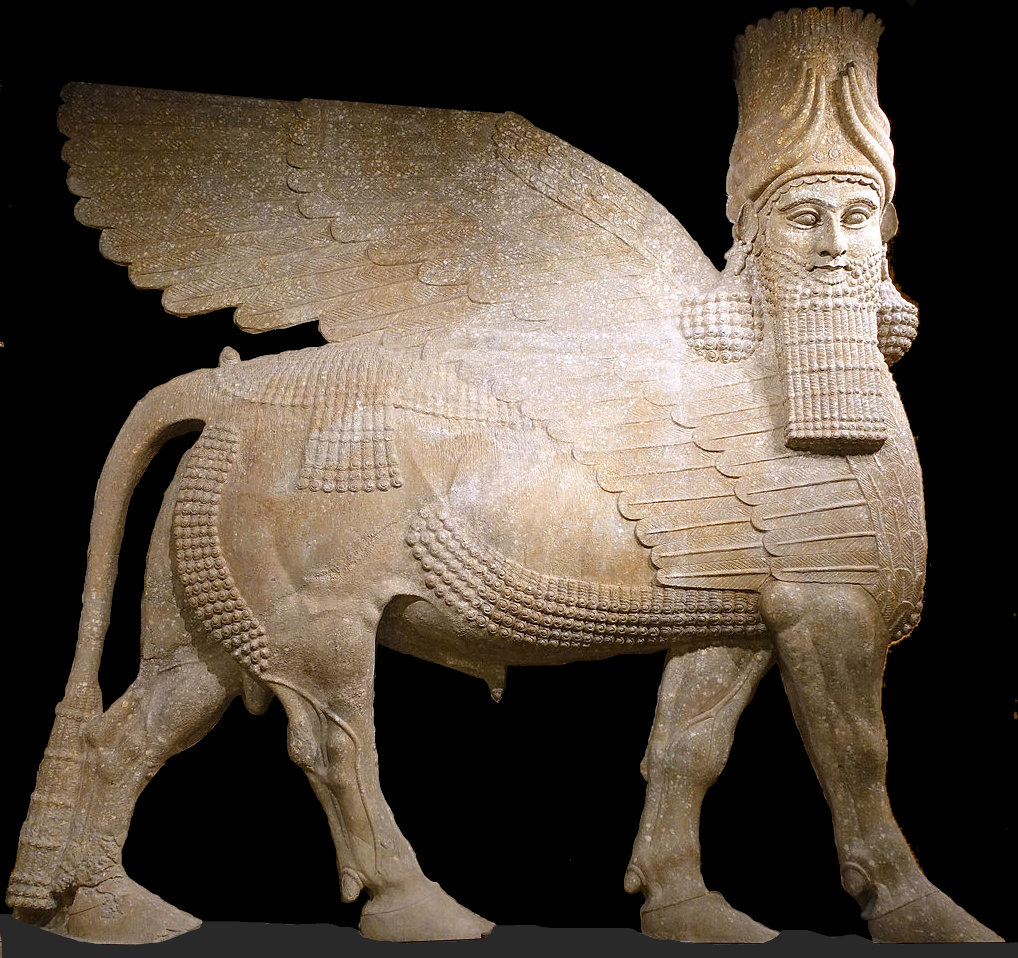
A giant lamassu from Sargon II's palace at Dur-Sharrukin

To supply cities with water, the Assyrians constructed advanced hydraulic works to divert and transport water from far-away mountain regions in the east and north. In Babylonia, water was typically simply drawn from the Tigris river, but it was difficult to do so in Assyria due to the river's level vis-à-vis the surrounding lands and changes in the water level. Because periods of drought often threatened Assyrian dry farming, several kings undertook irrigation projects, including canal construction. The most ambitious hydraulic engineering project was undertaken by Sennacherib during his renovation of Nineveh. As part of his building project, four large canal systems, together covering more than 150 kilometers (93.2 miles), were connected to the city from four different directions. These systems included canals, tunnels, weirs, aqueducts and natural watercourses. Other hydraulic works included sewage and drainage systems for buildings which made it possible to dispose of wastewater and efficiently drain the yards, roofs and toilets of palaces, temples, and private homes.

Transportation from far-away locations of goods and materials sometimes involved very heavy loads. Wood was for instance relatively scarce in the Assyrian heartland and as such had to be gathered from distant lands and transported for use as a building material. Wood was typically gathered from distant forests, transported to rivers and then hauled on rafts or ships. The most challenging type of transportation was the transport of large blocks of stone, necessary for various building projects. Several kings note in their royal inscriptions the difficulties involved in the transportation of the single massive blocks of stone needed to create the great lamassu (protective stone colossi with the head of a human, wings and the body of a bull) for their palaces. Because the stones had to be transported from sources several kilometers away from the capitals and were typically transported on boats, it was a difficult process, and several boats sank on the way. Under Sennacherib a quarry was opened on the left bank of the Tigris river, which led to the stones being able to be transported fully over land, a more secure but still very labor-intensive project. When transported over land, the great stones were moved by four teams of workers, overseen by supervisors, using wooden planks or rollers.

== Legacy ==
=== Culture ===
==== Literary and religious traditions ====
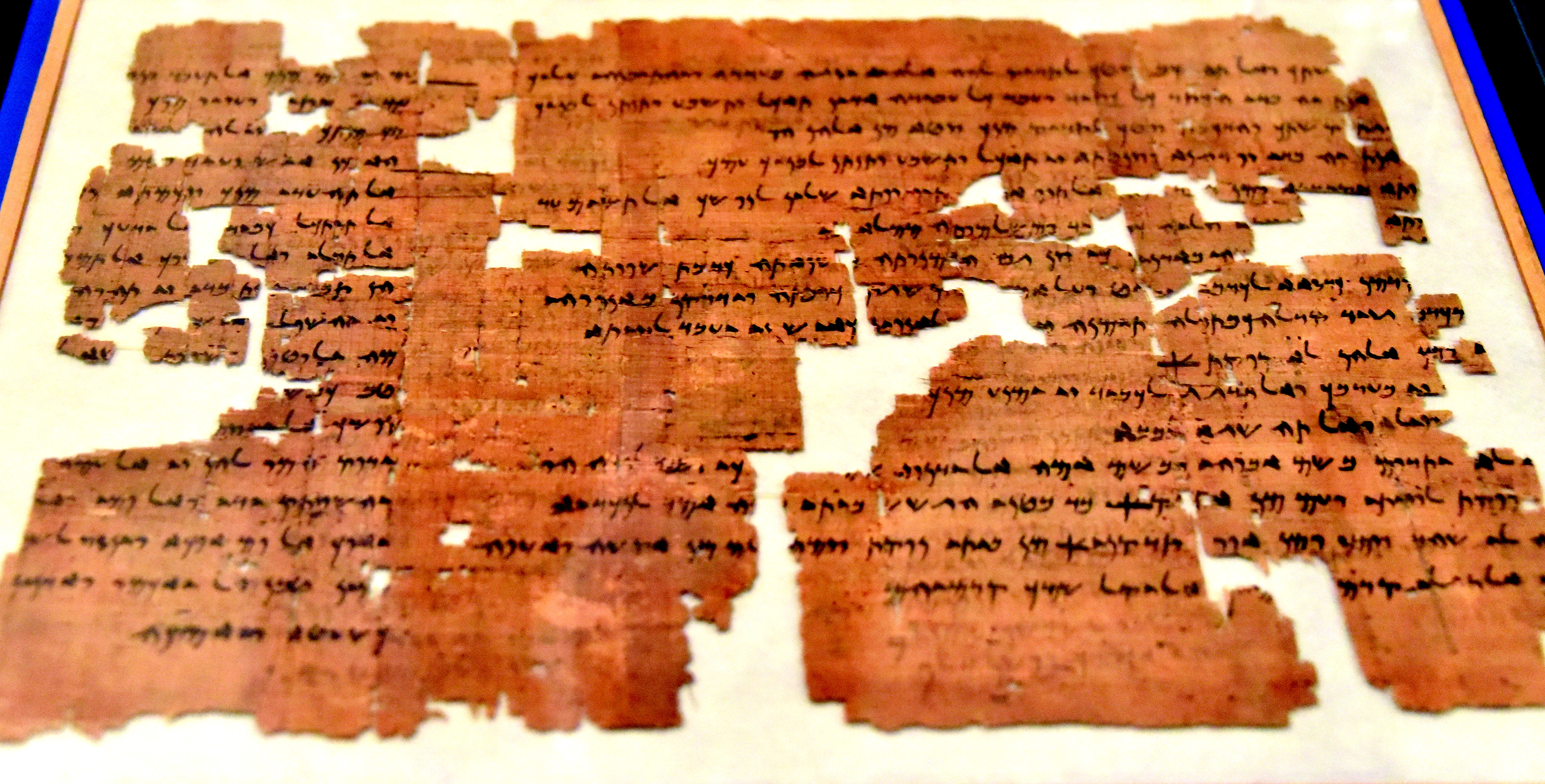
Egyptian papyrus from c. 500 BCE containing the Story of Ahikar

The empire left a cultural legacy of great consequence. The population of Upper Mesopotamia continued to keep the memory of their ancient civilization alive and to maintain a positive connection with the Assyrian Empire in local histories written as late as the Sasanian period. Figures like Sargon II, Sennacherib, Esarhaddon, Ashurbanipal and Shamash-shum-ukin long figured in local folklore and literary tradition. In large part, tales from the Sasanian period and later times were invented narratives, based on ancient Assyrian history but applied to local and current landscapes. Medieval tales written in Eastern Aramaic, particularly Syriac, portray Sennacherib as an archetypal pagan king, assassinated in a family feud whose children convert to Christianity. The legend of the Behnam, Sarah, and the Forty Martyrs, set in the 4th century but written long thereafter, casts Sennacherib, under the name Sinharib, as their royal father.

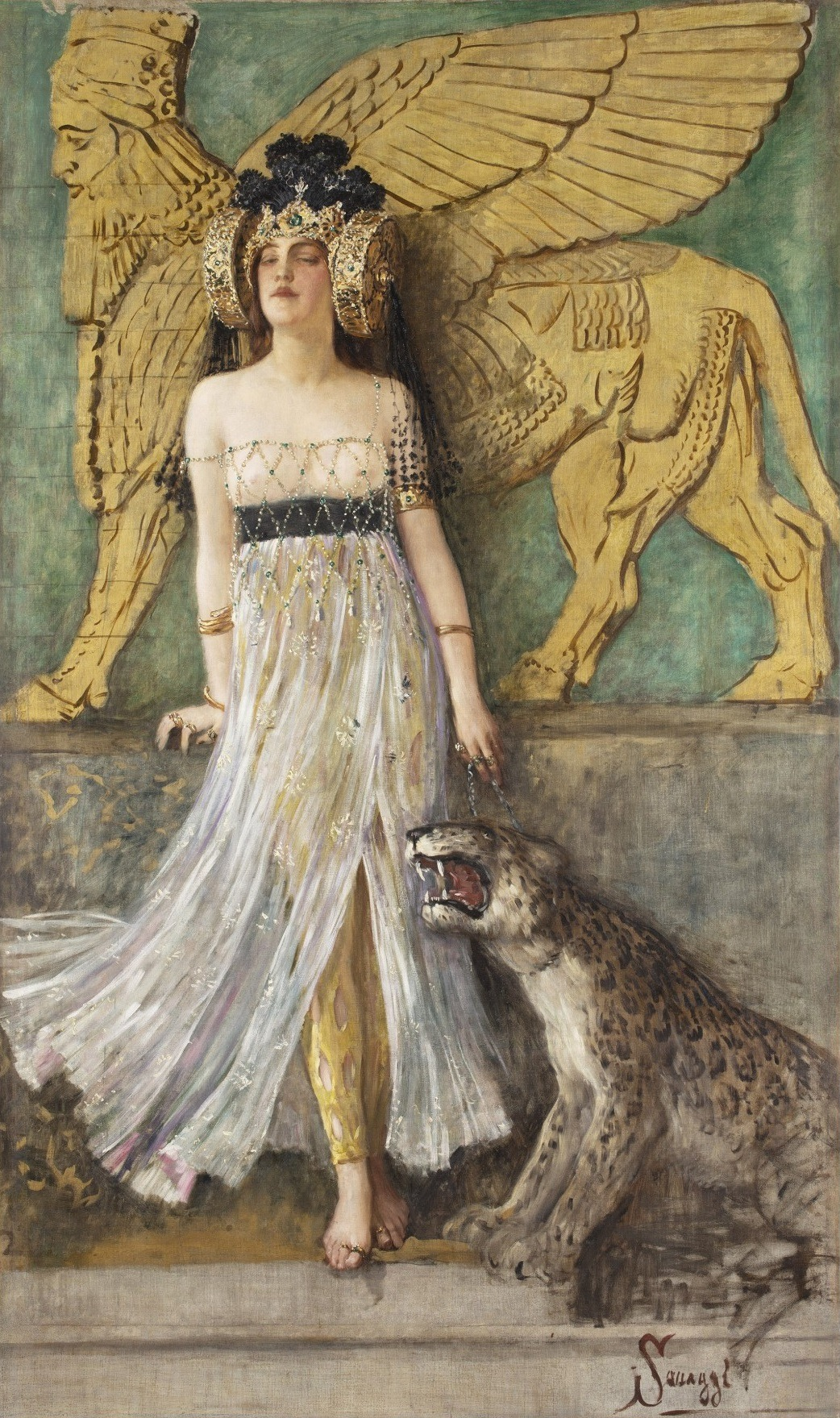
Great Semiramis, Queen of Assyria by Cesare Saccaggi

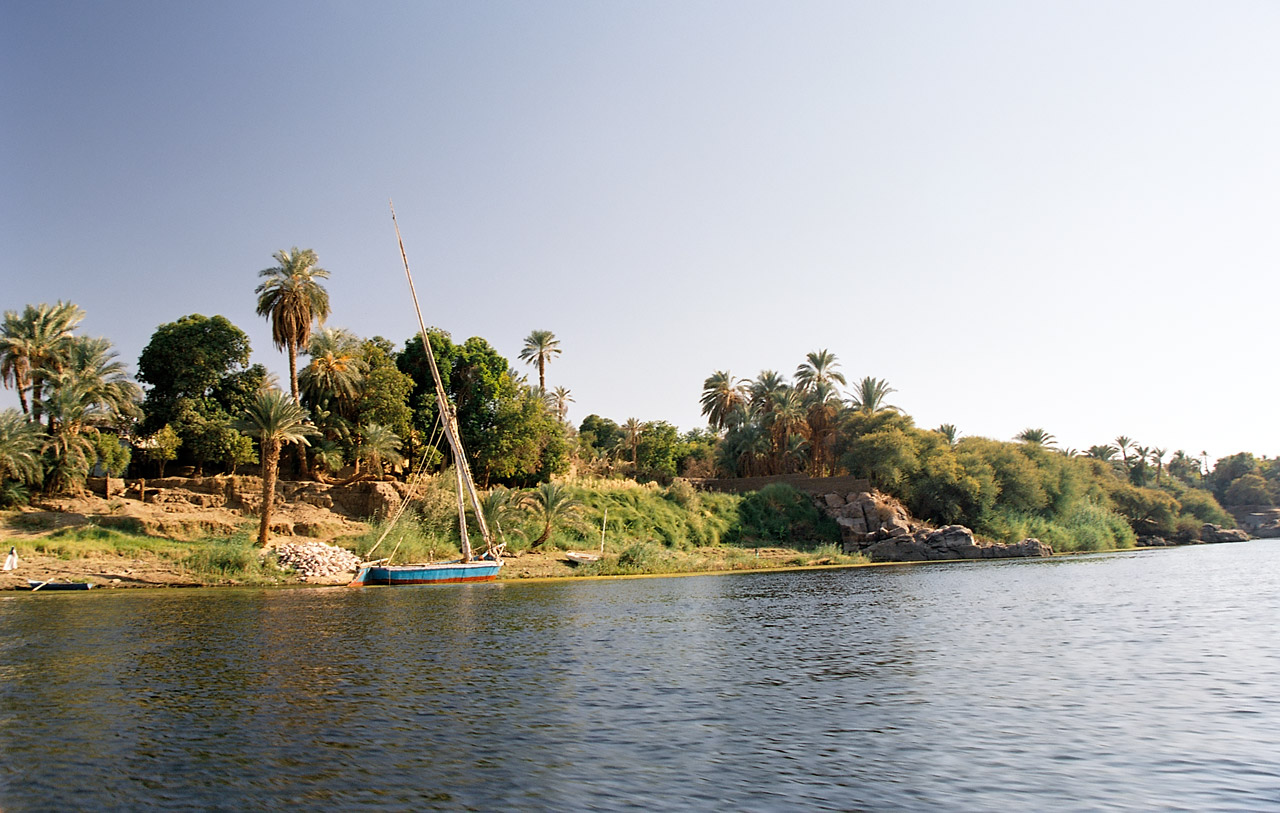
Western view of the isle of Elephantine, Egypt, where the Elephantine papyri and ostraca were found.

Some Aramaic stories spread far beyond Upper Mesopotamia. The Story of Ahikar follows a legendary royal advisor named Ahikar of Sennacherib and Esarhaddon and is first attested on an Elephantine papyrus from c. 500 BCE. This story proved popular and was translated into many languages. Other tales from Egypt include stories of the Egyptian hero Inarus, a fictionalized version of the rebel Inaros I, fighting against Esarhaddon's invasion of Egypt, as well as a tale recounting the civil war between Ashurbanipal and Šamaš-šuma-ukin. Some Egyptian tales feature a queen of the Amazons named Serpot, possibly based on Shammuramat.

Several legends of Assyria are known from Greco-Roman texts, including a fictional narrative of the founding of the empire and Nineveh by the legendary figure Ninus, as well as tales of Ninus's powerful wife Semiramis, another fictionalized version of Shammuramat. Legendary accounts were written of the empire's fall, erroneously linked to the reign of the effeminate Sardanapalus, a fictionalized version of Ashurbanipal.

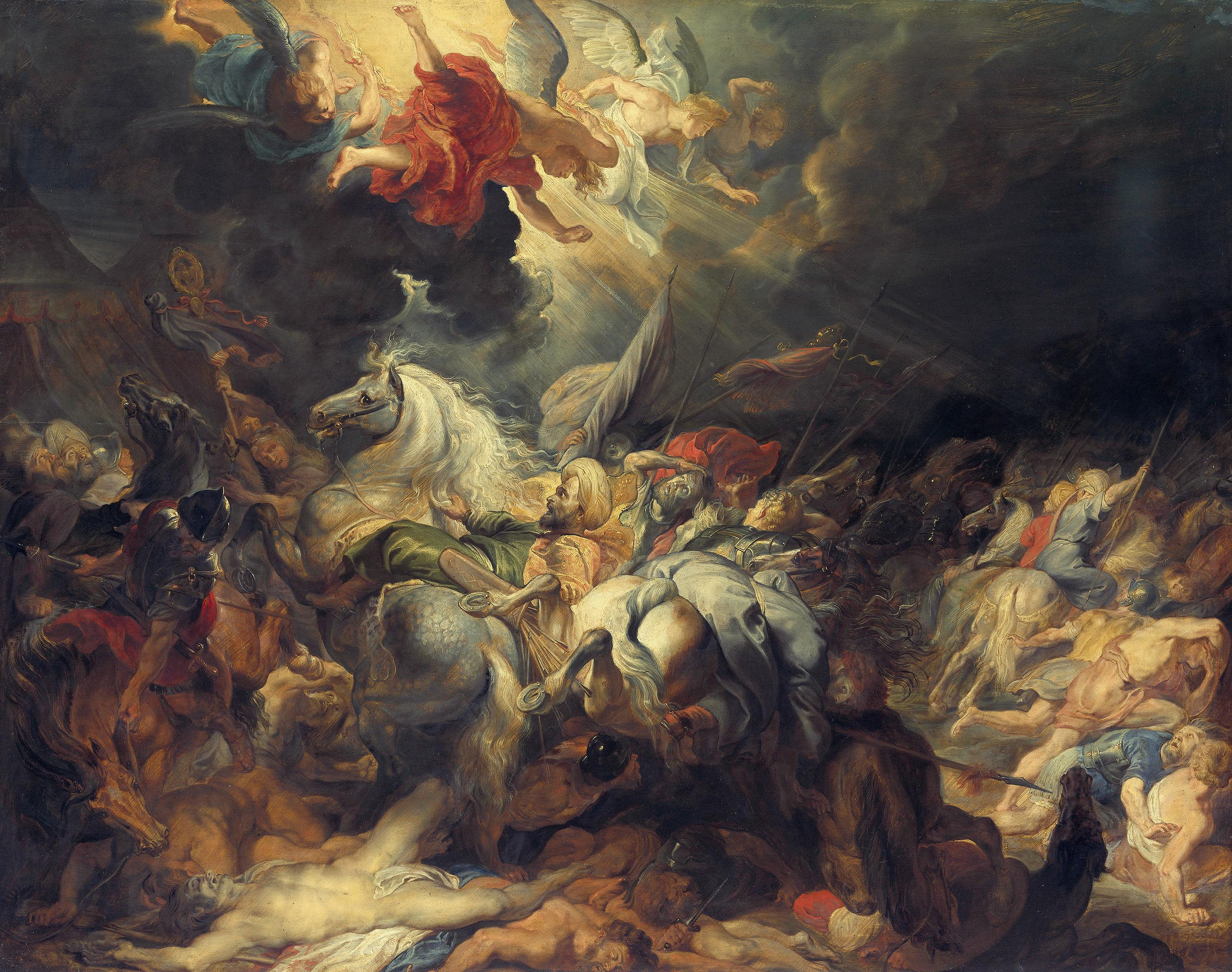
The Defeat of Sennacherib by Peter Paul Rubens

Though the empire did not force religious conversions, its existence as a large, imperialist state reshaped the religious views of the people around it, prominently ancient Israel and Judah. The Hebrew Bible mentions Assyria about 150 times; multiple significant events which involved the Israelites are mentioned, most prominently Sennacherib's war against Hezekiah, and several Neo-Assyrian kings are mentioned, including Tiglath-Pileser III, Shalmaneser V, Sargon II, Sennacherib, Esarhaddon and possibly Ashurbanipal. Though some positive associations of Assyria are included, the Bible generally paints the empire as an imperialist aggressor. Jewish theology was influenced by the empire: the Book of Deuteronomy bears a strong resemblance to the loyalty oaths in Assyrian vassal treaties, though with the absolute loyalty to the Assyrian king replaced with absolute loyalty to Yahweh. Additionally, some stories in the Bible appear to be at least partly drawn from events in Assyrian history; the story of Jonah and the whale might draw on earlier stories concerning Shammuramat, and the story of Joseph was likely at least partly inspired by Esarhaddon's rise to power.

Perhaps the empire's greatest influence on later Abrahamic religious tradition was that the emergence of a new religious and "national" identity among the Israelites might have been a direct response to the political and intellectual challenges posed by Assyrian imperialism. The most important innovation in Hebrew theology during the period roughly corresponding to the time of the Neo-Assyrian Empire was the elevation of Yahweh as the only god and the beginning of the monotheism that would later characterize Judaism, Christianity, and Islam. It has been suggested that this development only followed experiences either with the henotheism of the Assyrians regarding Aššur, or the monocratic and universal nature of the imperial rule of the Assyrian kings.

==== Archaeology ====
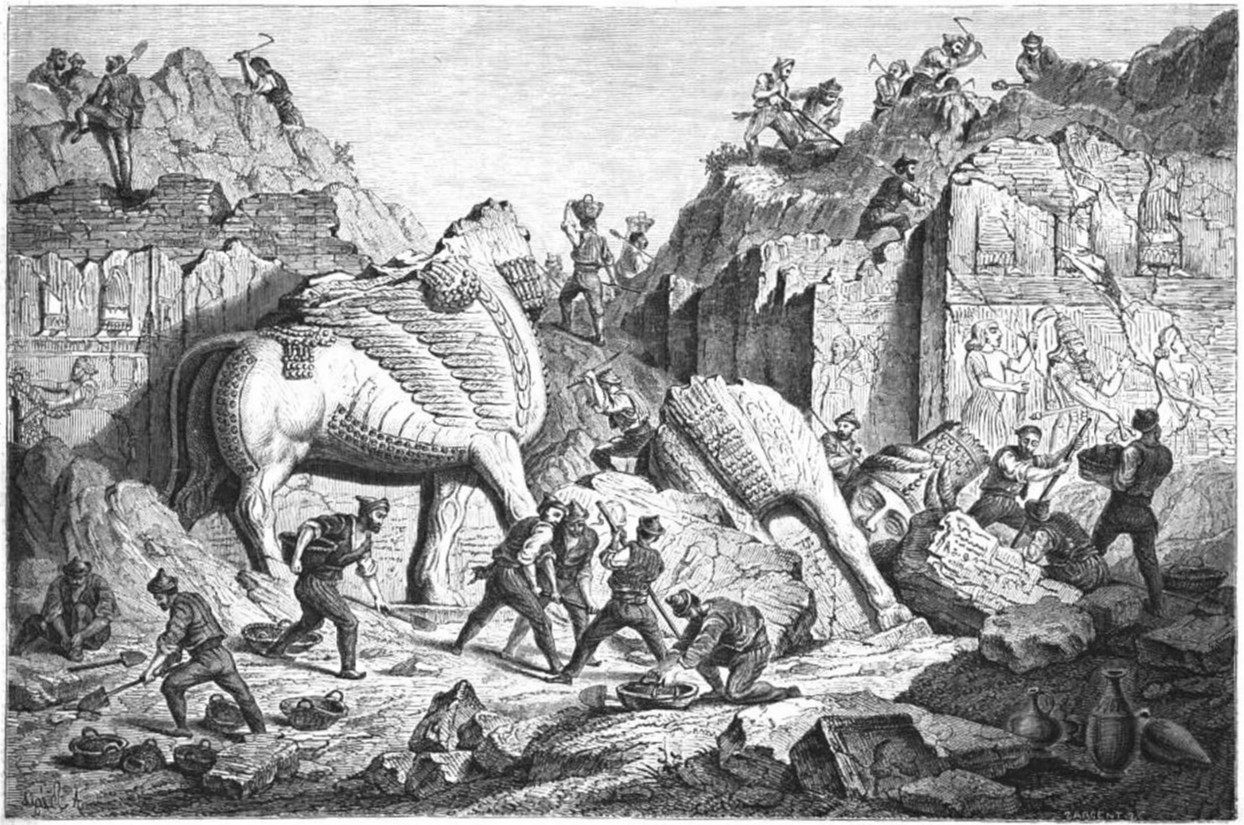
1861 illustration by Eugène Flandin of excavations of the ruins of Dur-Sharrukin

When the Medes and Babylonians conquered the Assyrian heartland, they put the monuments, palaces, temples and cities to the torch; the Assyrian people were dispersed, and the cities were for a long time left largely abandoned. Though Assyria experienced a resurgence in the post-imperial period, chiefly under the Seleucids and Parthians, the region was later devastated once more during the rise of the Sasanian Empire in the 3rd century AD. The only ancient Assyrian city to be continually inhabited as an urban center from the time of the Neo-Assyrian Empire to the present is Arbela, today known as Erbil.

Though the local population of northern Mesopotamia never forgot the Neo-Assyrian Empire and the locations of its capital cities, knowledge of Assyria in the west survived through the centuries chiefly through the accounts of the Bible and the works describing the empire by classical authors. Unlike other ancient civilizations, Assyria and other Mesopotamian civilizations left no magnificent ruins above ground; all that remained to see were grass-covered mounds in the plains which travellers at times believed to simply be natural features of the landscape.

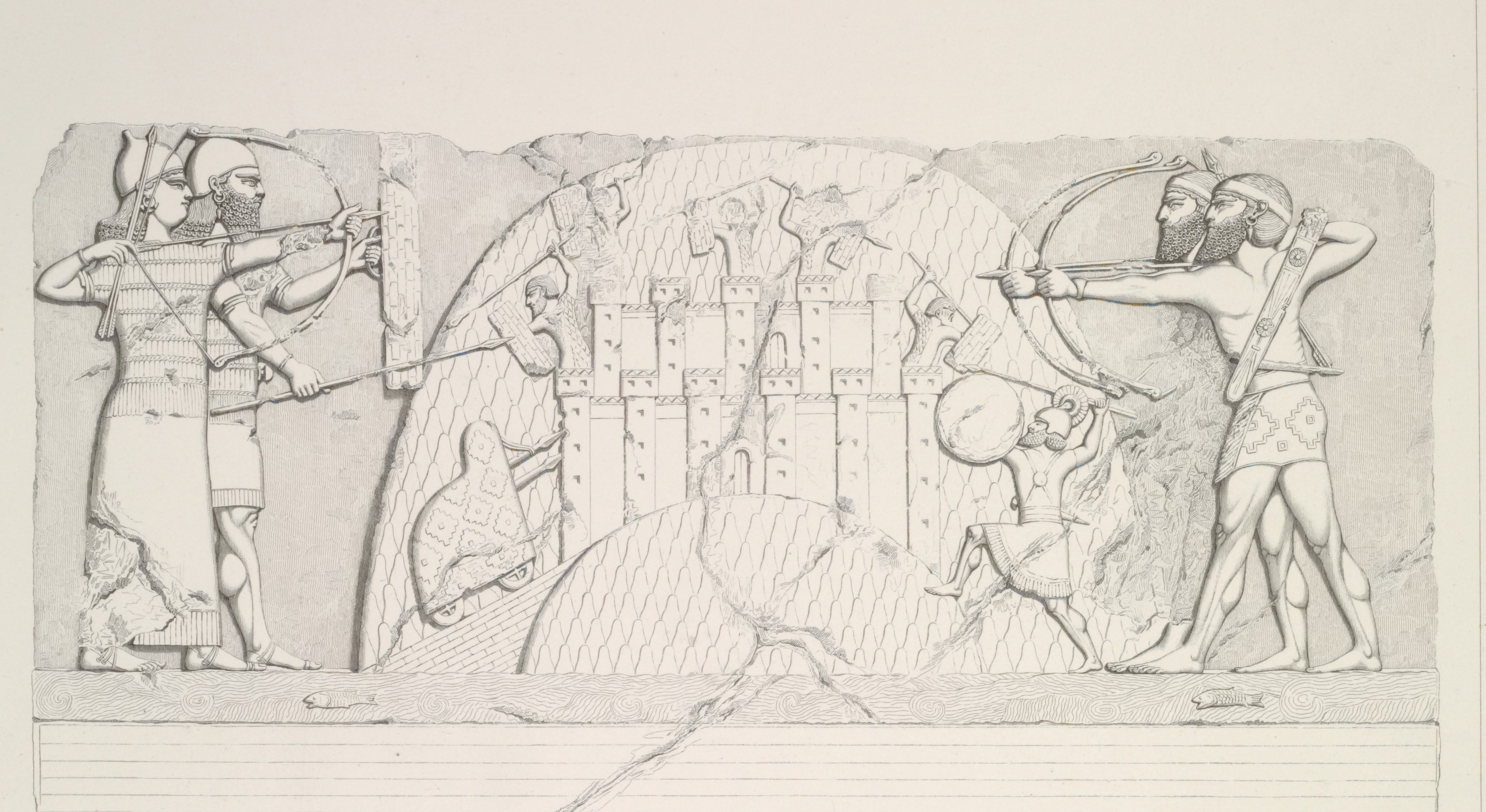
1849 illustration of a relief from Dur-Sharrukin by Eugène Flandin

In the early 19th century, European explorers and archaeologists first began to investigate the ancient mounds. One of the important early figures in Assyrian archaeology was British business agent Claudius Rich who visited the site of Nineveh in 1820, traded antiquities with the locals and made measurements of the mounds. Rich's collection (which ended up in the British Museum) and writings inspired Julius von Mohl, secretary of the French Société Asiatique, to persuade the French authorities to create the position of a French consul in Mosul and to start excavations at Nineveh. The first consul to be appointed was Paul-Émile Botta in 1841. Using funds secured by von Mohl, Botta conducted extensive excavations at Nineveh, particularly on the Kuyunjik mound. Because the ancient ruins of Nineveh were hidden deep under layers of later settlement and agricultural activities, Botta's excavation never reached them. Upon hearing reports by locals that they had uncovered Assyrian ruins, Botta turned his attention to the site of Khorsabad, 20 kilometers to the northeast, where he discovered the ruins of an ancient palace. Botta had uncovered the ancient city of Dur-Sharrukin. The works of art found under Botta's supervision included reliefs and stone lamassus. In 1847 the first exhibition on Assyrian sculptures was held in the Louvre. After returning to Europe in the late 1840s, Botta compiled an elaborate report on the findings, complete with numerous drawings of the reliefs made by artist Eugène Flandin. The report, published in 1849, showcases the majesty of Assyrian art and architecture.

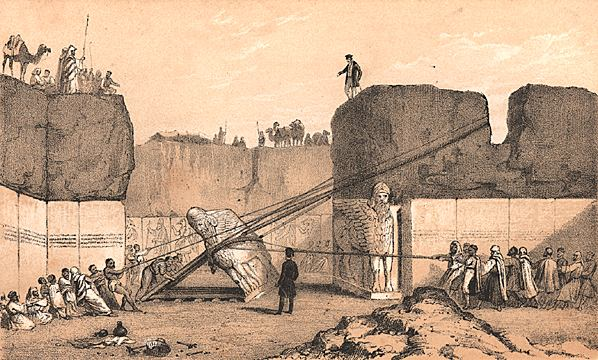
1852 illustration by Austen Henry Layard of excavations at Nineveh

English archaeologist Austen Henry Layard wrote in the 19th century: "mighty ruins in the midst of deserts, defying, by their very desolation and lack of definite form, the description of the traveller". Layard began his activities in November 1845 at Nimrud (though he believed this to be the site of Nineveh), working as a private individual without any permission to excavate from the Ottoman authorities; he initially tried to fool the local pasha through claiming that he was on a hunting trip. The expedition was funded by the British Ambassador to the Ottoman Empire, Stratford Canning. Layard discovered ruins of numerous palaces, including the Northwest Palace of Ashurnasirpal II, with numerous walls covered in reliefs. Layard's illustrated two-volume book presenting his discoveries, Nineveh and its Remains, was published in 1849. Layard conducted a second expedition in which he turned his attention to the Kuyunjik mound. There he made significant discoveries, including the palace built by Sennacherib.

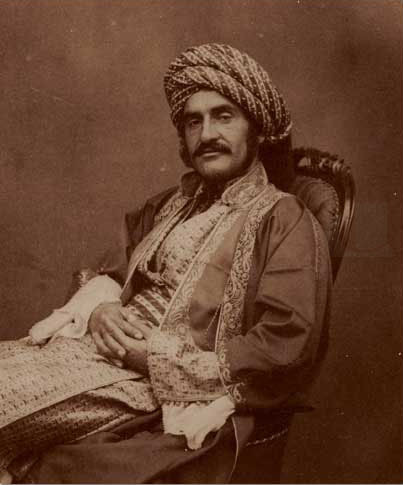
Portrait of the Assyrian archaeologist Hormuzd Rassam c. 1854

In 1852, the French continued excavations at Khorsabad, with Victor Place instructed to procure "the largest possible" amount of Assyrian artefacts. Rivalry between the Louvre and the British Museum played a significant role in the intensity of early exploration and excavation of Assyrian sites. Though Layard left Mesopotamia in 1851, the British Museum appointed his close assistant, Assyrian Hormuzd Rassam, to continue excavation projects in the region. After the outbreak of the Crimean War in 1853, archaeology in Assyria remained dead for a long time, though excavations began again in the early 20th century and have continued since.

=== Status as a world empire ===
Though some point to the Akkadian Empire (c. 2334–2154 BCE) or the Eighteenth Dynasty of Egypt (c. 1550–1290 BCE), many researchers consider the Neo-Assyrian Empire to be the first world empire in history. Although the Neo-Assyrian Empire covered between 1.4 and 1.7 million square kilometers (0.54–0.66 million square miles; just a little over one percent of the land area of the planet), the terms "world empire" or "universal empire" should not be taken as denoting actual world domination. The Neo-Assyrian Empire was at its height the largest empire yet to be formed in history and was regarded by the Assyrians and many of their contemporaries as "universal", while the lands remaining outside their dominions—such as the Arabian desert and the highlands of the Zagros Mountains—were dismissed "empty", at the fringes of the world and inhabited by uncivilized peoples.

A "world empire" can also be interpreted as an imperial state without any competitors. Though there were other reasonably large kingdoms in the ancient Near East during the Neo-Assyrian period—notably Urartu in the north, Egypt in the west and Elam in the east—none were existential threats to Assyria and could do little else than defend themselves in times of war; whereas Assyrian troops routinely plundered and campaigned in the heartlands of these kingdoms, the Assyrian heartland was not invaded until the fall of the empire. Nevertheless, the existence of other organized kingdoms undermined the notion of the Assyrians as universal rulers. It is partly because of this that large military campaigns were conducted with the express goal of conquering these kingdoms and fulfilling the ideological mission of ruling the world. At the height of the empire under Esarhaddon and Ashurbanipal, only Urartu remained since Egypt had been conquered and Elam left destroyed and desolate.

==== Ideological influence ====
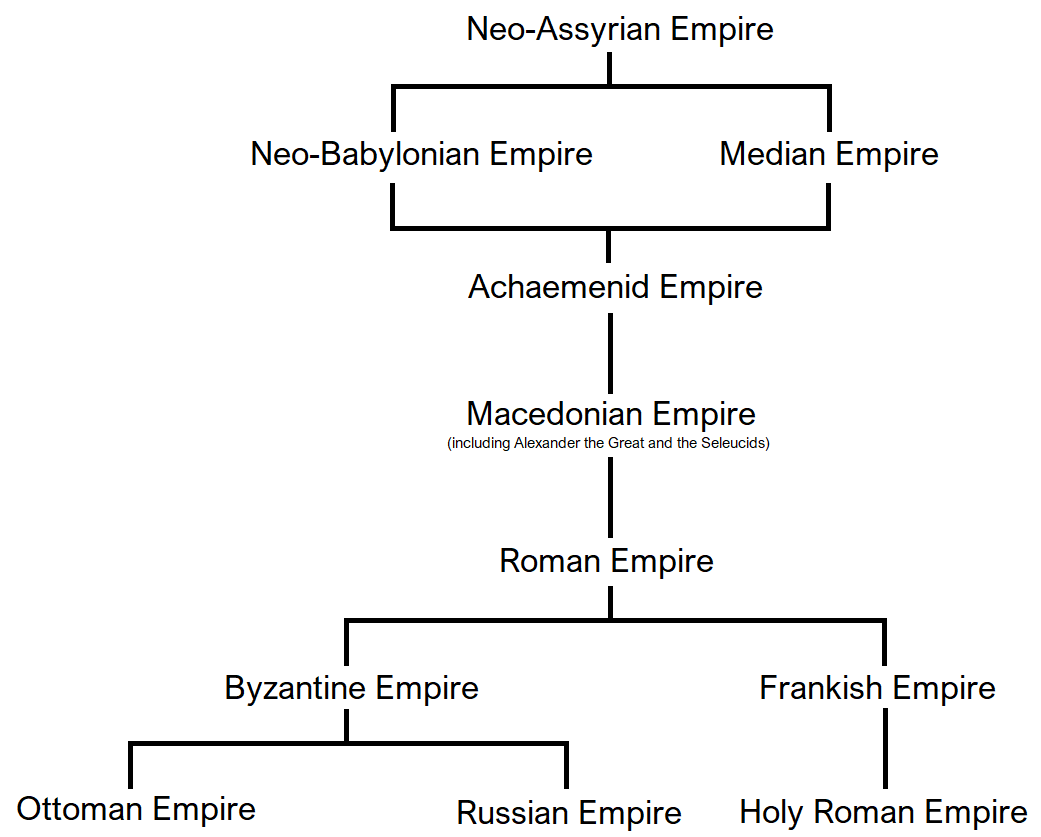
Chart depicting the ideological translatio imperii, i.e. supposed transfer of the right to universal rule, from the Neo-Assyrian Empire to (rival) early modern states claiming the same right

Ideologically, the empire formed an important part in the imperial ideologies of succeeding empires in the Middle East. The idea of continuity between successive empires (a phenomenon in later times dubbed translatio imperii) was a long established tradition in Mesopotamia, going back to the Sumerian King List which connected succeeding and sometimes rival dynasties and kingdoms together as predecessors and successors. In the past, the idea of succession between empires had resulted in claims such as that of the Dynasty of Isin being the successor of the Third Dynasty of Ur, or Babylonia being the successor of the Akkadian Empire. The idea of translatio imperii supposes that there is only one "true" empire at any given time, and that imperial power and right to rule is inherited from one empire to the next, with Assyria typically seen as the first empire.

Ancient Greek historians such as Herodotus and Ctesias supported a sequence of three world empires and a successive transfer of world domination from the Assyrians to the Medes to the Achaemenids. Inscriptions from several of the Achaemenid kings, most notably Cyrus the Great, alludes to their empire being the successor of the Neo-Assyrian Empire. Shortly after Alexander the Great conquered Persia, his Macedonian Empire began to be regarded as the fourth empire. Texts from the Neo-Babylonian period regard the Neo-Babylonian Empire as the successor of the Neo-Assyrian Empire. Babylonian texts from the time Mesopotamia came under the rule of the Seleucid Empire centuries later supported a longer sequence, with imperial power being transferred from the Assyrians to the Babylonians, then to the Achaemenids and finally to the Macedonians, with the Seleucid Empire being viewed as the same empire as Alexander's empire. Later traditions were somewhat confused in the set of empires, with some conflating Assyria with Babylonia as a single empire, though still counting the Macedonians/Seleucids as the fourth due to counting both Babylonia and the Medes (despite them being contemporaries). The Book of Daniel describes a dream of the Neo-Babylonian King Nebuchadnezzar II which features a statue with a golden head, silver chest, bronze belly, iron legs and iron/clay feet. This statue is interpreted as an expression of translatio imperii, placing Nebuchadnezzar's empire (the Neo-Babylonian Empire; gold) as the first empire, the Median Empire (silver) as the second, the Achaemenid Empire (bronze) as the third and the Macedonian Empire of Alexander the Great (iron) as the fourth.

The idea of succession of empires did not end with the fall of the Seleucid Empire; traditions were instead adjusted to include later empires in the sequence. Shortly after the Roman Empire conquered the last remnants of the Seleucid Empire in 63 BCE, literary traditions began to regard the Roman Empire as the fifth world empire. The Roman Empire spawned its own sequences of successor claimants; in the east it was followed by the Byzantine Empire, from which both the Russian and Ottoman empires claimed succession. In the west, the Frankish and eventually Holy Roman empires considered themselves to be the heirs of Rome. Later scholars have sometimes posited a sequence of world empires more focused on the Middle East. In British scholar George Rawlinson's 1862–67 work The Five Great Monarchies of the Ancient Eastern World, the five Oriental empires are regarded to have been Chaldaea (erroneous since no such empire existed), Assyria, Babylonia, Media and Persia. Rawlinson expanded the sequence in his 1876 The Seven Great Monarchies of the Ancient Eastern World to include the Parthian and Sasanian empires. Though expansive sequences of translatio imperii hold little weight in modern research, scholars today still recognize a basic sequence of imperial succession from the Neo-Assyrian Empire to the Neo-Babylonian Empire to the Achaemenid Empire.

==== Administrative influence ====
The political structures established by the Neo-Assyrian Empire became the model for the later empires that succeeded it. Key components of the Neo-Babylonian Empire were based on the Neo-Assyrian Empire. Though the administrative structure of the Neo-Babylonian Empire is not known due to the scant surviving sources, and it is thus unclear to what degree the old provincial divisions and administration of the Neo-Assyrian Empire continued to be in use, the organization of the central palace bureaucracy under the Neo-Babylonian kings was based on that of the Neo-Assyrian Empire, not any established earlier Babylonian models. Additionally, Neo-Babylonian construction projects, such as Nebuchadnezzar II's massive expansion of Babylon, followed Assyrian traditions; as the Neo-Assyrian kings had done in their new capitals, Nebuchadnezzar placed his palace on a raised terrace across the city wall and followed a rectangular plan for the inner city. The sophisticated Assyrian road system, first created during the Middle Assyrian period, also continued to be in use and served as a model for sophisticated road systems of the Neo-Babylonian and Achaemenid empires.

=== Reputation of brutality ===
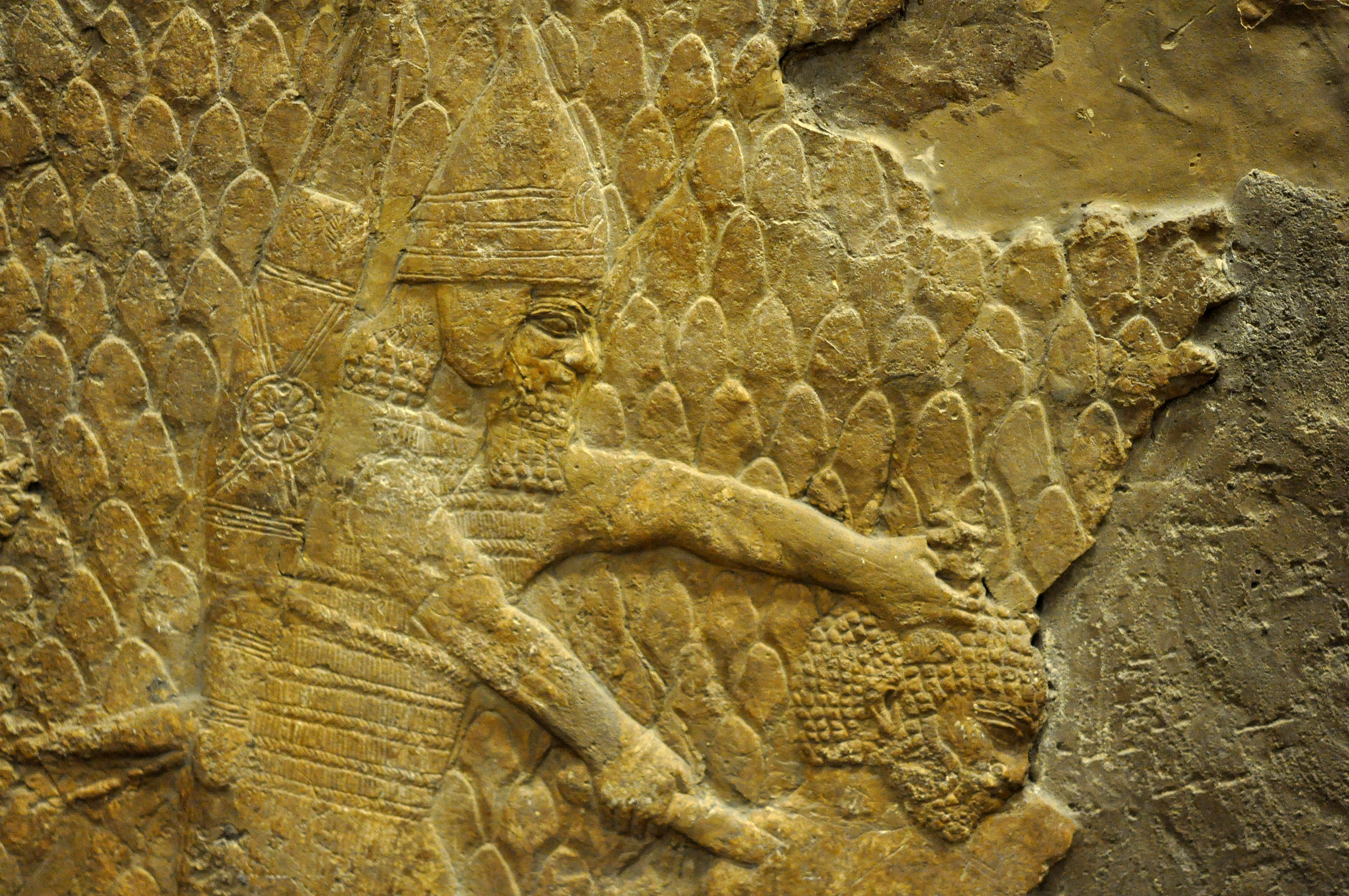
Relief of Sennacherib, depicting an Assyrian soldier beheading a prisoner

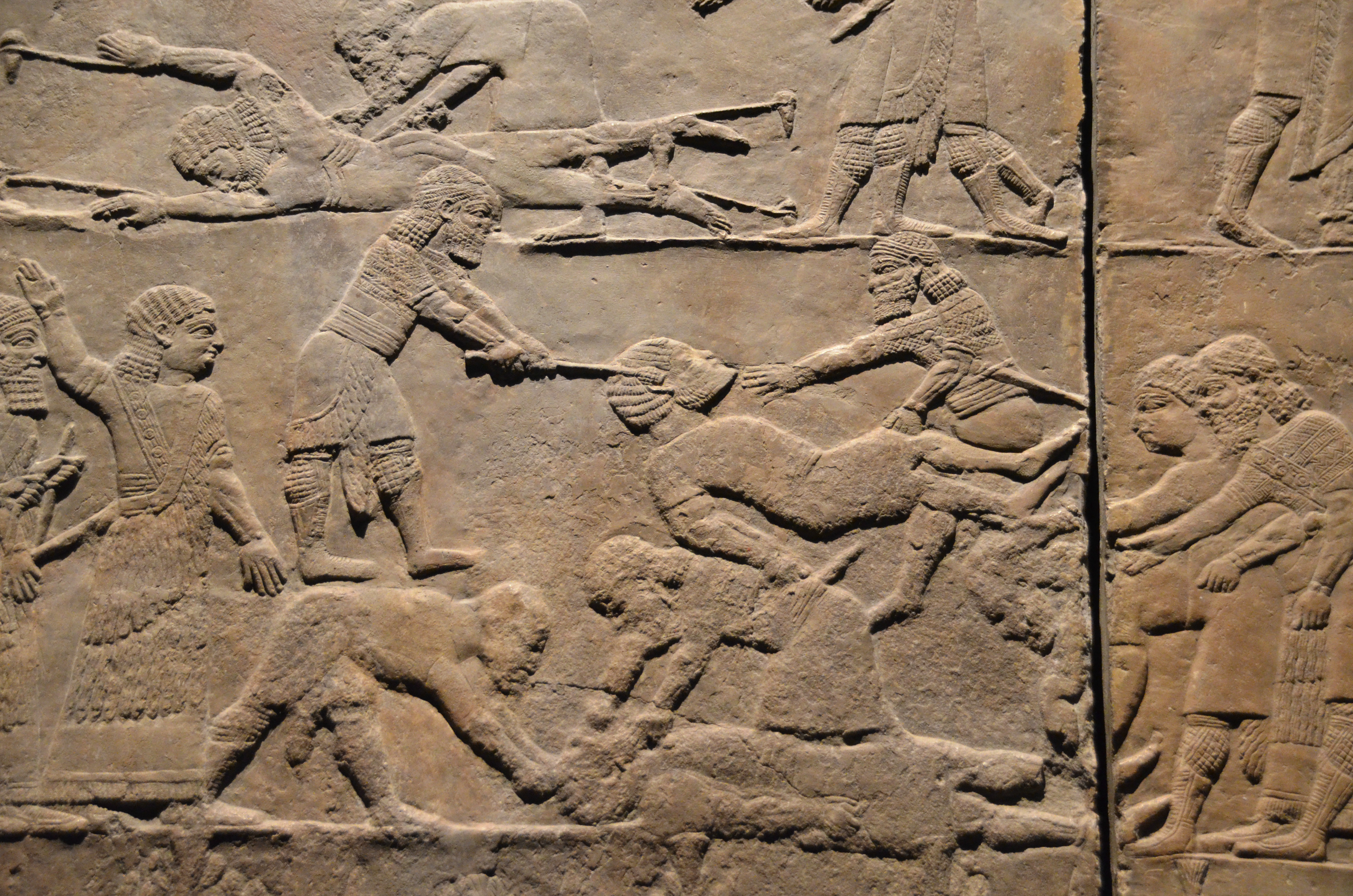
Relief of Ashurbanipal depicting Elamite chiefs having their tongues removed and being flayed alive

I built a pillar over against the city gate and I flayed all the chiefs who had revolted and I covered the pillar with their skins. Some I impaled upon the pillar on stakes and others I bound to stakes round the pillar. I cut the limbs off the officers who had rebelled. Many captives I burned with fire and many I took as living captives. From some I cut off their noses, their ears, and their fingers, of many I put out their eyes. I made one pillar of the living and another of heads and I bound their heads to tree trunks round about the city. Their young men and maidens I consumed with fire. The rest of their warriors I consumed with thirst in the desert of the Euphrates.

— Inscription by Ashurnasirpal II (r. 883–859 BCE)

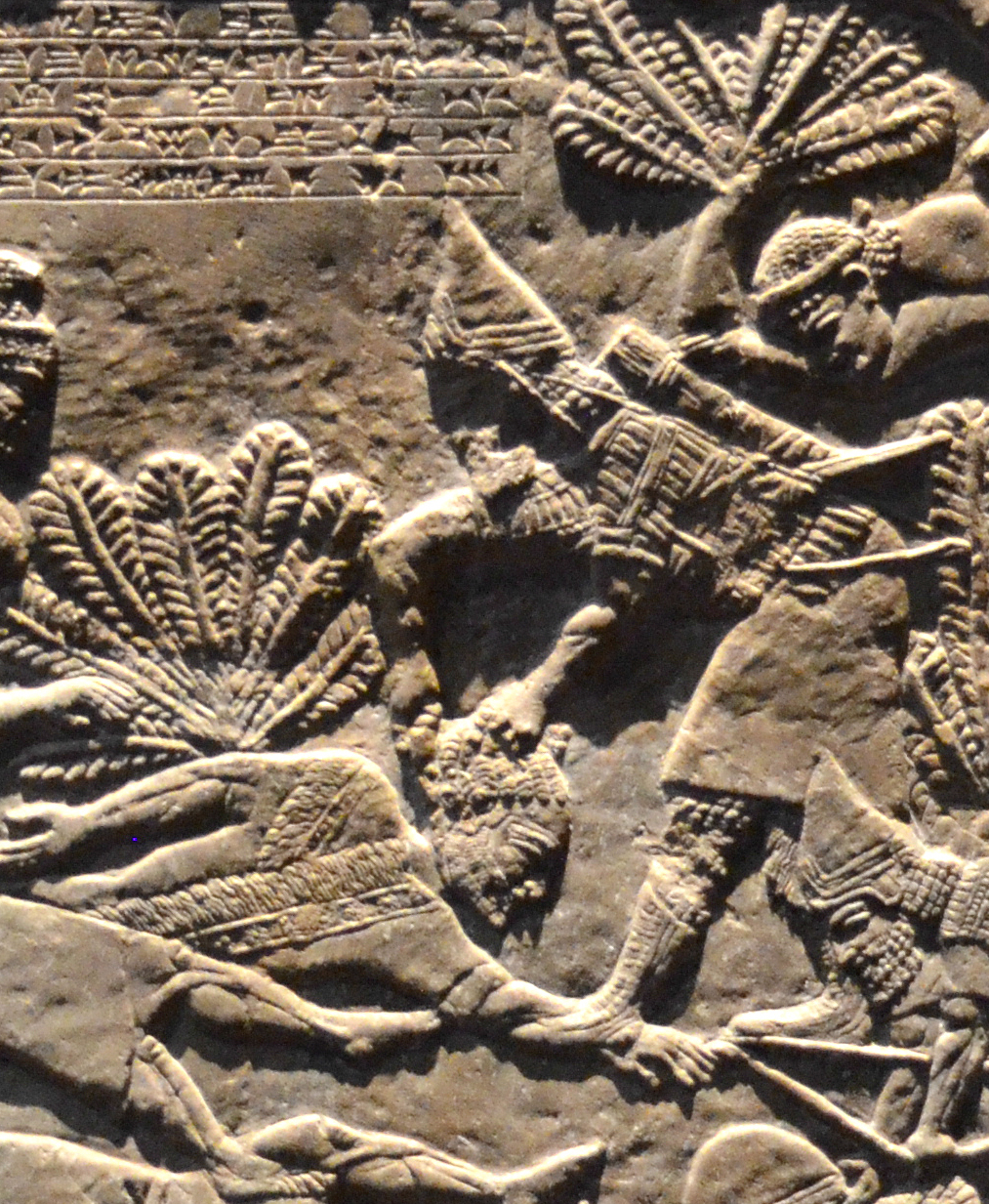
Relief of Ashurbanipal, depicting the beheading of the Elamite king Teumman

The empire is perhaps most prominently remembered for the ferocity and brutality of its army. Neo-Assyrian inscriptions and artwork are unusually explicit in description and depiction of various atrocities, often describing them with "terrifying realism". It is chiefly from the Neo-Assyrian period that royal inscriptions describe atrocities in detail, though various atrocities were enacted against enemy states and peoples by certain Middle Assyrian kings as well. This may be attributable to the Neo-Assyrian kings using fear to keep their conquered territories in-line after declines in power during the Middle Assyrian Empire.

Biblical and other historical references to Assyrian brutality were reinforced by the 19th-century discoveries of ancient art and inscriptions, as well as by unflattering comparisons drawn between Assyria and the Ottoman Empire by the historians and archaeologists who found them. Today, despite the diversity of ancient Assyrian culture, military and atrocity scenes dominate museum exhibitions on Assyria because of their distinct character.

Though there is no modern scholarly denial that the Neo-Assyrian government was brutal, the extent to which the inscriptions and artwork reflect actual atrocities is debated. Some believe that the Assyrians were more brutal than depicted because inscriptions and art do not include all the gruesome details or record every instance, whereas others believe Assyrian kings used exaggerated descriptions of brutal acts as tools for propaganda and psychological warfare.

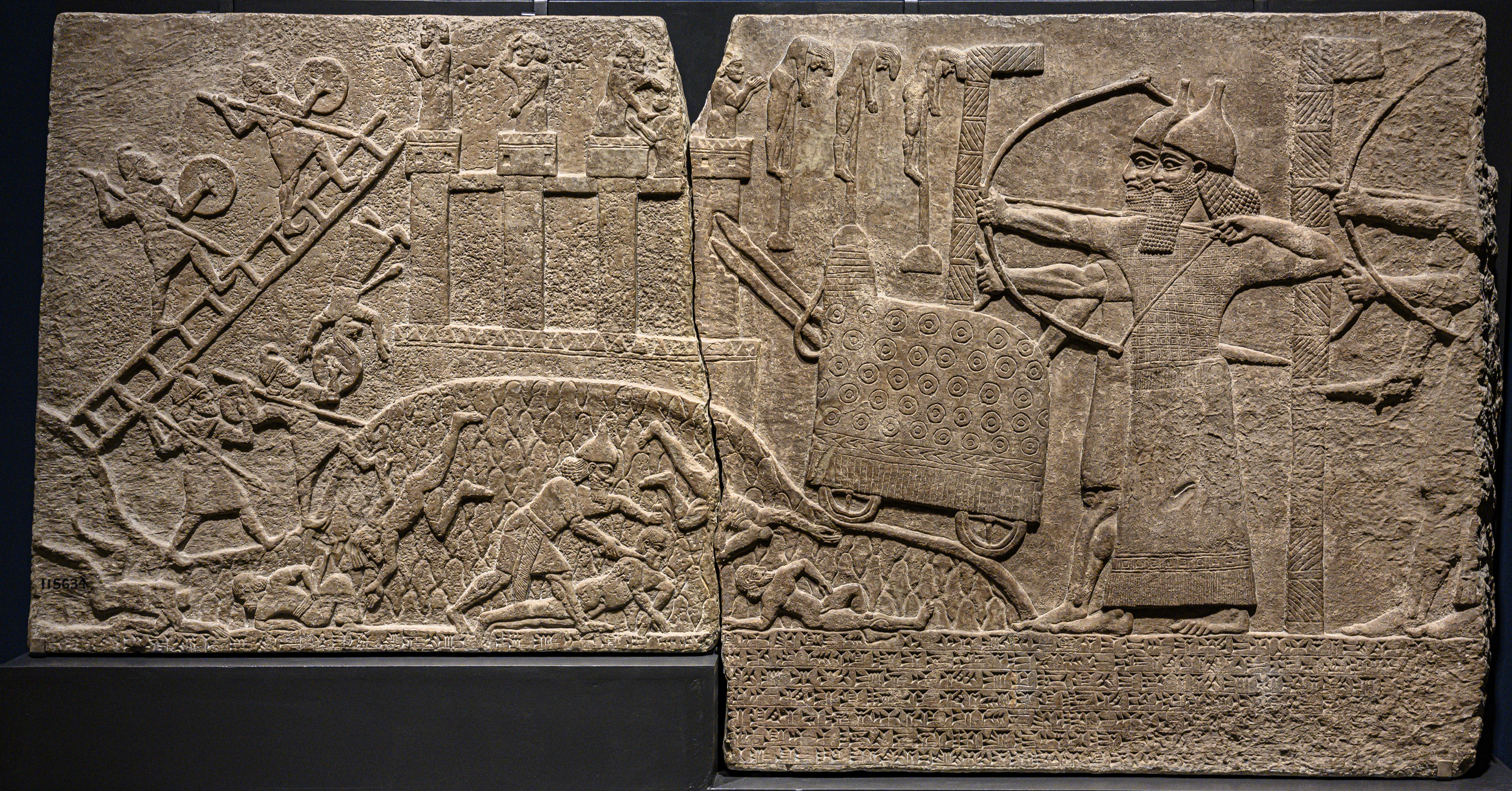
Relief from Tiglath-Pileser's palace in Nimrud depicting the Assyrians besieging a town

Although Neo-Assyrian art is particularly graphic, actual practice in war was likely similar in character to their cultural neighbors, if more effective and broader in impact because of a higher level of bureaucratic organization. Detailed analysis of palace friezes suggests that brutality was typically targeted to intimidate and dissuade foreigners and vassals from fighting against Assyrian dominion. The vast majority of depicted brutal acts were directed against the soldiers and nobility of Assyria's enemies, with civilians only rarely being brutalized, suggesting cultural limits and restraints for most of neo-Assyrian rule.

The acts of genocide and ethnic cleansing in the Neo-Assyrian Empire remains contested among scholars; Raphael Lemkin who coined the term "genocide", claimed that Ashurbanipal committed the most flagrant act of genocide against Elam, an attack motivated by desire for revenge and punishment. Eckart Frahm, on the contrary, explains that the indiscriminate killing of civilians was occasionally used by the Assyrians as a deterrent for possible rebels, though they had no interest in genocidal campaigns. It also appears that no consistent pattern can be found in Assyrian texts indicating the extermination of particular ethnic groups. While the Assyrian Empire did regularly carry out mass deportations of people from conquered regions, it was not done for the purpose of ethnically cleansing.

== See also ==
- Assyrian nationalism
- Assyrian genocide
- History of Mesopotamia
- List of Mesopotamian dynasties
- Superpower
