= Military history of the Neo-Assyrian Empire =

Assyrian Army
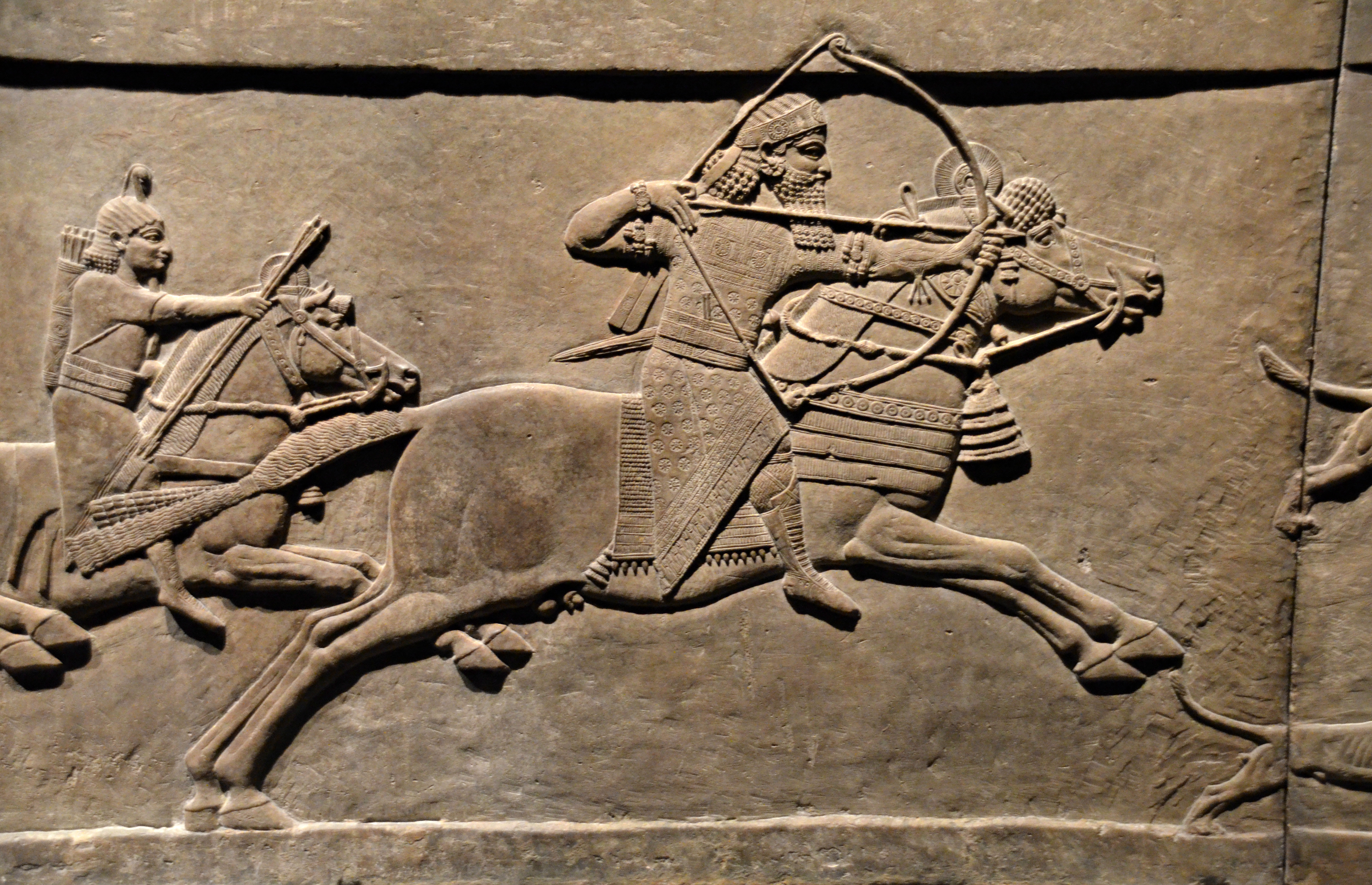
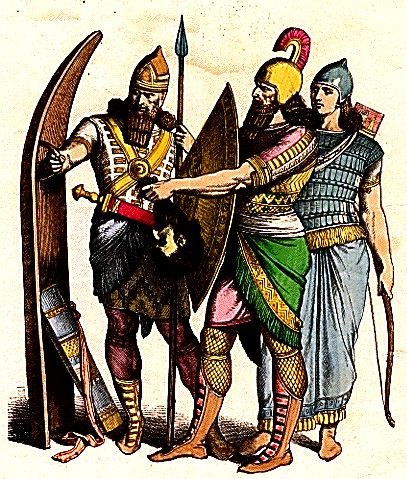
- Assyrian soldiers, from a plate in THE HISTORY OF COSTUME by Braun & Schneider (c. 1860).
- Leader: King of Assyria
- Dates active: 911 BC – 605 BC
- Headquarters: Kalhu (Nimrud), Assur, Nineveh, Harran, Dur-Sharrukin (Khorsabad)
- Active regions: Mesopotamia, parts of the Levant, Anatolia, Egypt and western Persia
- Size: capable of 120,000+ men
- Part of: Assyrian Empire
- Wars: Assyrian wars of conquest

The Neo-Assyrian Empire arose in the 10th century BC. Ashurnasirpal II is credited for utilizing sound strategy in his wars of conquest. While aiming to secure defensible frontiers, he would launch raids further inland against his opponents as a means of securing economic benefit, as he did when campaigning in the Levant. The result meant that the economic prosperity of the region would fuel the Assyrian war machine.

Ashurnasirpal II was succeeded by Shalmaneser III. Although he campaigned for 31 years of his 35-year reign, he failed to achieve or equal the conquests of his predecessor, and his death led to another period of weakness in Assyrian rule.

Assyria would later recover under Tiglath-Pileser III, whose reforms once again made Assyria the most powerful force in the Near East, and transformed it into a fully fledged empire – the first of its kind. Later, under Shalmaneser V, Sargon II and Sennacherib, further Assyrian offensives occurred, although these were designed not only for conquest, but also to destroy their enemies' ability to undermine Assyrian power. As such, costly battles raged taking tolls on Assyrian manpower. Esarhaddon succeeded in taking lower Egypt and his successor, Ashurbanipal, took the southern upper half of Egypt.

However, by the end of the Ashurbanipal's reign it appears that the Assyrian Empire was falling into another period of weakness, one from which it would not escape. It appears that years of costly battles followed by constant (and almost unstoppable) rebellions meant that it was a matter of time before Assyria ran out of troops. The loss of the outer regions meant that foreign troops were gone too. By 605 BC, independent political Neo-Assyrian records vanish from history.

== Background ==
The Assyrian empire has been described as the "first military power in history". Mesopotamia was the site of some of the earliest recorded battles in history. In fact, the first recorded battle was between the forces of Lagash and Umma c. 2450 BC. Like many Mesopotamian records, it contains elements of fiction. The ruler of Lagash, Eanatum, was inspired by the god Ningirsu to attack the rival kingdom of Umma; the two were involved in minor skirmishes and raids along their respective borders. Although Eanatum triumphed, he was struck in the eye by an arrow. After the battle, he had the Stele of the Vultures erected to celebrate his victory.

=== Middle Assyrian ===
Under Shamshi-Adad I (1813–1791 BC) and his successor Ishme-Dagan (1790–1754 BC), Assyria was the seat of a regional empire controlling northern Mesopotamia and regions in Asia Minor and northern Syria. From 1365 to 1076 BC, Assyria became a major empire and world power, rivalling Egypt. Kings such as Ashur-uballit I (1365–1330 BC), Enlil-nirari (1329–1308 BC), Arik-den-ili (c. 1307–1296 BC), Adad-nirari I (1295–1275 BC), Shalmaneser I (1274–1245 BC), Tukulti-Ninurta I (1244–1208 BC), Ashur-resh-ishi I (1133–1116 BC) and Tiglath-Pileser I (1115–1077 BC) forged an empire which at its peak stretched from the Mediterranean Sea to the Caspian Sea, and from the foothills of the Caucasus to Arabia. The 11th and 10th centuries BC were a dark age for the entire Near East, North Africa, Caucasus, Mediterranean and Balkan regions, with great upheavals and mass movements of people. Despite the apparent weakness of Assyria, at heart it remained a solid, well defended nation whose warriors were the best in the world. Assyria, with its stable monarchy and secure borders, was in a stronger position during this time than potential rivals such as Egypt, Babylonia, Elam, Phrygia, Urartu, Persia and Media.

Information on the Assyrian army during this time is difficult to make out. The Assyrians were able to establish their independence on two occasions, during the Old Assyrian Empire and the Middle Assyrian Empire, with the latter reaching as far as Babylon in their pursuit of conquest. However, military tactics mainly involved using troops raised from farmers who had finished planting their fields and so could campaign for the king until harvest time called for their attention again. The result was that military campaigning was limited to a few months of the year. As a result, armies could not conquer vast amounts of land without having to rest (and hence allow their enemy to recover) and even if they did they would not be able to garrison conquered lands with troops for long.

== Organization of the military ==
The Assyrian army's hierarchy was typical of the Mesopotamian armies at the time. The King whose rule was sanctioned by the gods, would be the commander of the entire army of the Empire. He would appoint senior officers on certain occasions to campaign in his place if his presence on the battlefield could or had to be spared. Such officials included family members (for instance Adad-nirari III's mother Shammuramat and Sargon II's brother Sin-ahu-usur) or influential generals and courtiers (for instance turtanus such as Dayyan-Assur and Shamshi-ilu). The Neo-Assyrian Empire took advantage of many different types and styles of militaristic vessels and engines for warfare. This includes chariots, cavalry, and siege engines.

=== Pre-reform ===
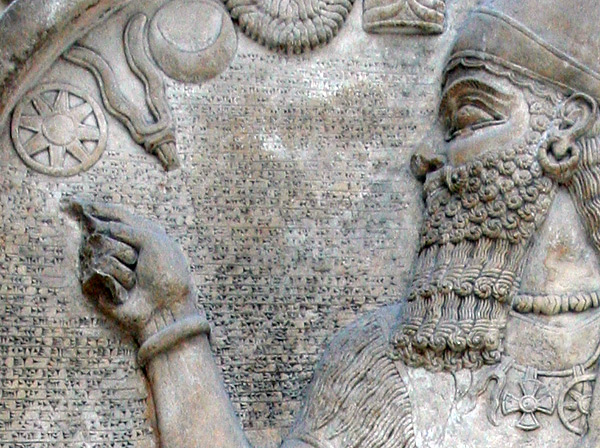
Assyria's greatest pre-reform military commander, Ashurnasirpal II

Before the reforms of Tiglath-Pileser III, the Assyrian army was also very much similar to the other Mesopotamian armies of the time. Soldiers were mostly raised farmers, who had to return to their fields to collect the harvest. Professional soldiers were limited to a few bodyguards that protected the King and or other nobles and officials, but these would not have been deployed or wasted in battle unless the situation became urgent, as it later did.

Assyrian armies could be very large; Shalmaneser III once boasted a force of 120,000 men in his campaigns against Syria. Such a force required men to be extracted from conquered peoples. A large army also needed more food and supplies and for this the Assyrians organized what they needed for a campaign before they set out.

=== Preparations for a new campaign ===
Preparations for a new campaign required first and foremost the assembly of troops at a designated base. In Assyria, the designated locations included Nineveh, Kalhu or Khorsabad. On some occasions the designated meeting points would change depending upon the campaign. Governors were instructed to accumulate supplies of grain, oil and war material. Other requirements of the Governors included calling up the needed manpower. Vassal states were in particular required to present troops as part of their tribute to the Assyrian king and in good time: failure to do so would have almost certainly been seen as an act of rebellion.

The arrival of the King and his bodyguard ended the preliminary stage and the army would move on to the target of their campaign. The army would march in good order; in the vanguard came the standard of the Gods, signifying the servitude of the Assyrian Kings to their primary God Assur. Following this was the King, the humble servant of Assur surrounded by his bodyguard with the support of the main chariot divisions and cavalry, the elite of the army. In the rear was the infantry; the Assyrian troops followed by the conquered peoples. Following this would be the siege train, supply wagons and then the camp followers. Such a formation would have been very vulnerable to a rear attack. Some columns of troops could travel 30 miles a day and such speed would have been used to surprise and frighten an opponent into submission.

=== Reforms of Tiglath-Pileser III ===
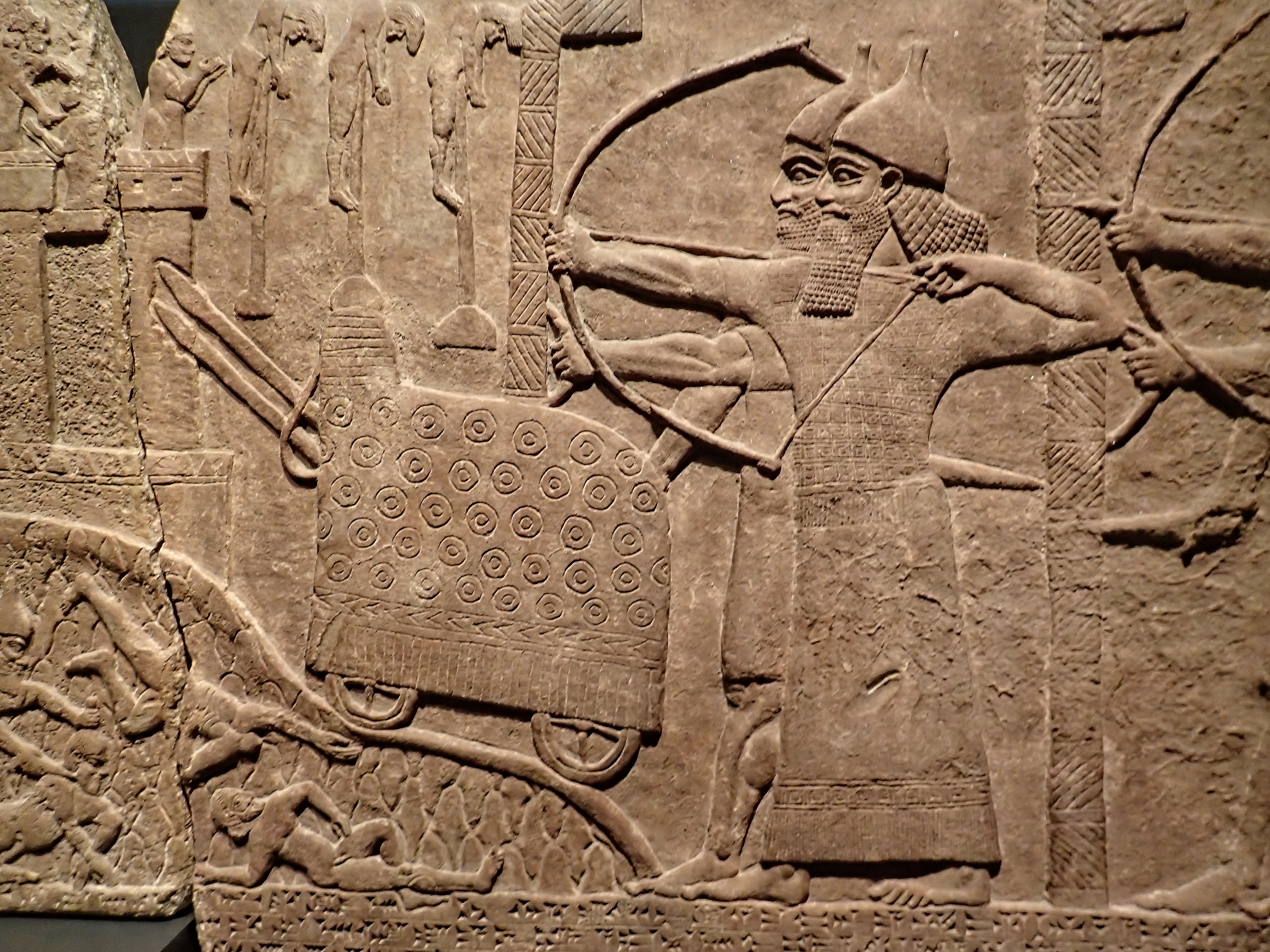
An image of Tiglath-Pileser III's troops. In the background, a siege engine can be seen.

Before long, the weaknesses of the Assyrian army soon began to show itself. Battle after battle killed off important soldiers, while the seasons ensured that soldiers returned after a short time to their fields without achieving decisive conquests. By the mid-eighth century BC, the Assyrian levy-army could not cope with the demands of an empire that often stretched from the Mediterranean Sea to the Persian Gulf.

All was to change when Tiglath-Pileser III came to the throne in 745 BC. After increasing the efficiency of the Assyrian administration, he went on to change the Assyrian army as well. The most important aspect of his reform was the introduction of a standing army. This included large numbers of foreign soldiers mixed in with the Assyrian soldiers. These men could be supplied by provincial governors as levies or recruited professional units, vassal states as tribute, or when demanded by the Assyrian King. They were given Assyrian equipment and uniform which made them indistinguishable from one another, possibly to increase their integration. While the infantry in the standing army contained a large number of foreigners (including Aramaeans and even Greeks), the Assyrian cavalry and charioteers continued to be dominated by Assyrians. There were exceptions however, and as casualties mounted additional troops would not be unwelcome; Sargon II reports that he managed to incorporate 60 Israelite chariot teams into his army.

=== Transportation and communication ===
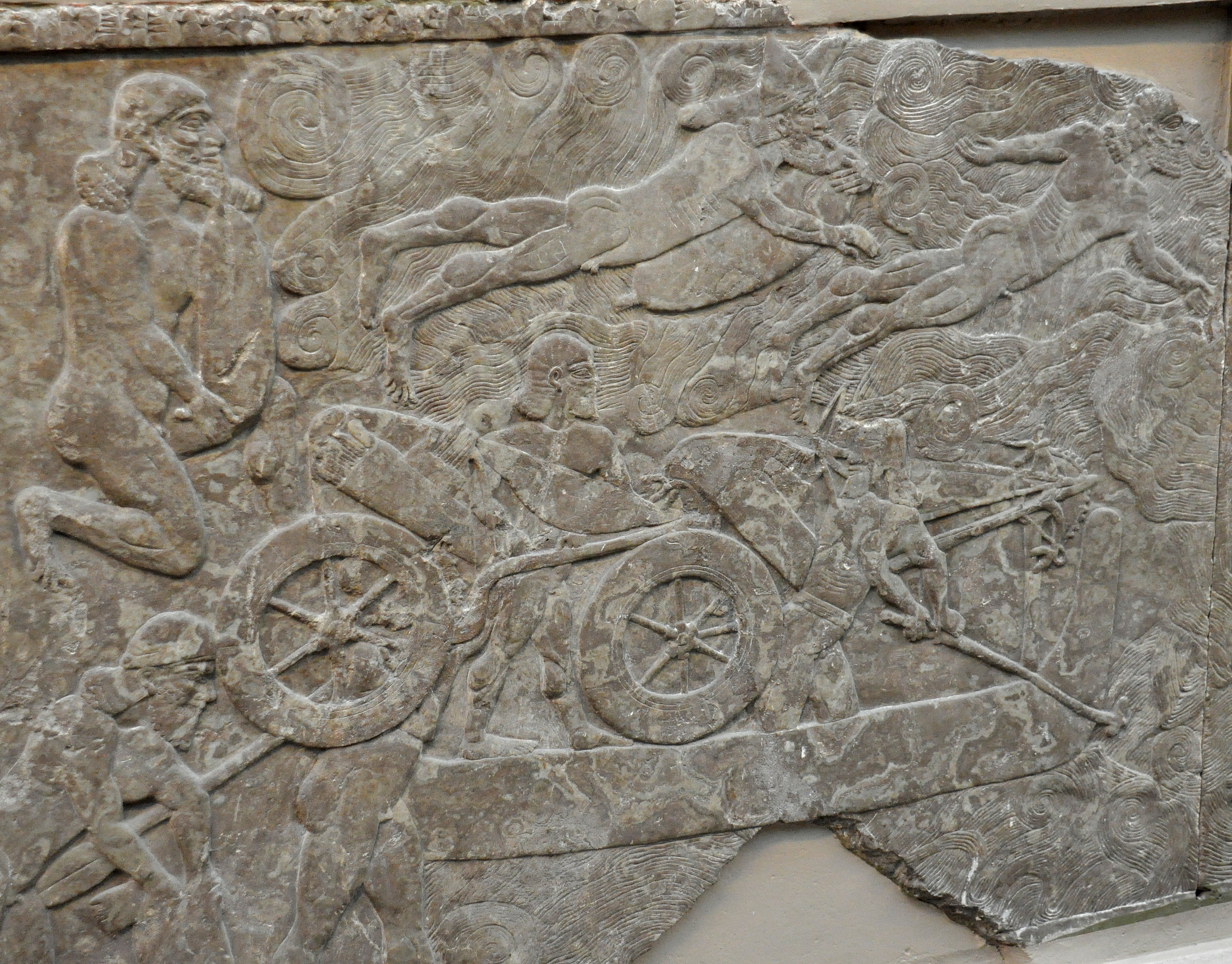
Assyrian army crosses a river, probably the Euphrates. Some soldiers are swimming while others are loading chariots on to a boat. Reign of Ashurnasirapl II, 865–860 BC, from Nimrud, currently housed in the British Museum

Assyrians using inflated sheep skins to transport chariots across the Euphrates (or Tigris).

With the rise of the Assyrian Empire, new demands were placed on transport and communication. Prior to the Neo-Assyrian Empire, roads in Mesopotamia were little more than well-trodden pathways used by the locals. However, this was inadequate for an empire whose armies were constantly on the move, repressing one revolt after another. The Assyrians were the first to institute, control and maintain a system of roads throughout their empire. A state communication system with regular way stations for messengers to rest and/or exchange mounts were established. Later, these would form the basis for the Persians to expand this system to their own empire.

Rugged mountains were cut through thus greatly decreasing travel time. Engineers built fine stone pavements leading up to the grand cities of Assur and Nineveh, so as to impress foreigners with the wealth of Assyria. By the 2nd millennium BC, wooden bridges were built across the Euphrates. By the 1st millennium BC, Nineveh and Assur had stone bridges, testament to the wealth of the kingdom of Ashur. The construction of roads and increased transport meant that goods would flow through the empire with greater ease, thus feeding the Assyrian war effort further. Of course, roads that sped up Assyrian troops would not discriminate and would speed up enemy troops as well.

=== Use of camels ===
The Assyrians were the first to use camels as beasts of burden for their military campaigns. Camels were of greater use than donkeys because they could carry five times the load but required less watering. Camels were not domesticated until shortly before 1000 BC, on the eve of the Neo-Assyrian Empire. The first camel to be domesticated was the dromedary.

=== Wheeled vehicles ===
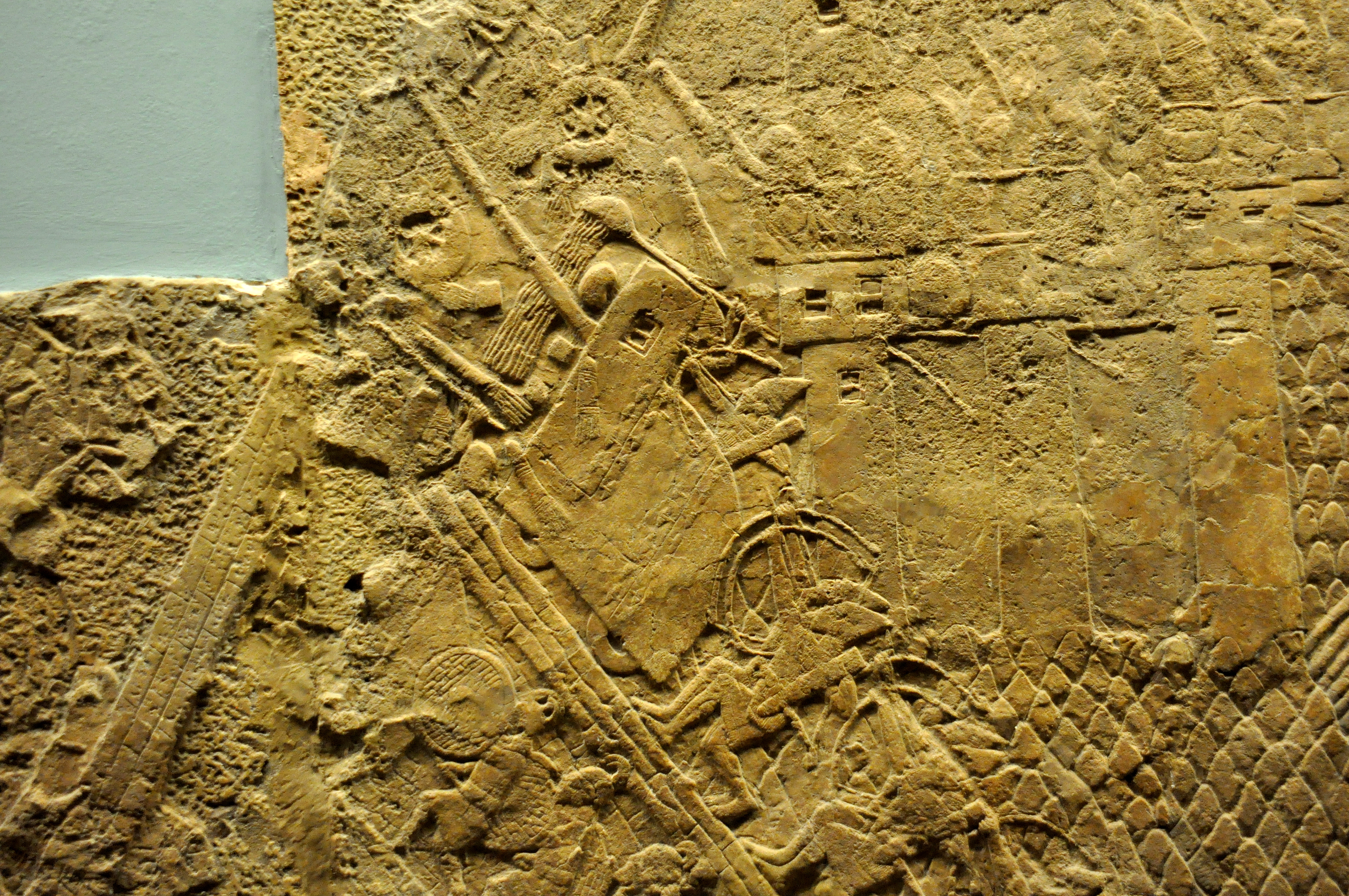
Assyrian siege-engine attacking the city wall of Lachish, part of the ascending assaulting wave. Detail of a wall relief dating back to the reign of Sennacherib, 700–692 BC. From Nineveh, Iraq, currently housed in the British Museum

Traditionally, the Sumerians are credited for inventing the wheel sometime before 3000 BC, although there is increasing evidence to support an Indo-European origin in the Black Sea region of Ukraine (Wolchover, Scientific American, 2012). In any case, the Assyrians were the first to manufacture tires of metal, made from copper, bronze and later iron. Metal-covered wheels have the advantage of being more durable.

=== Weapons ===
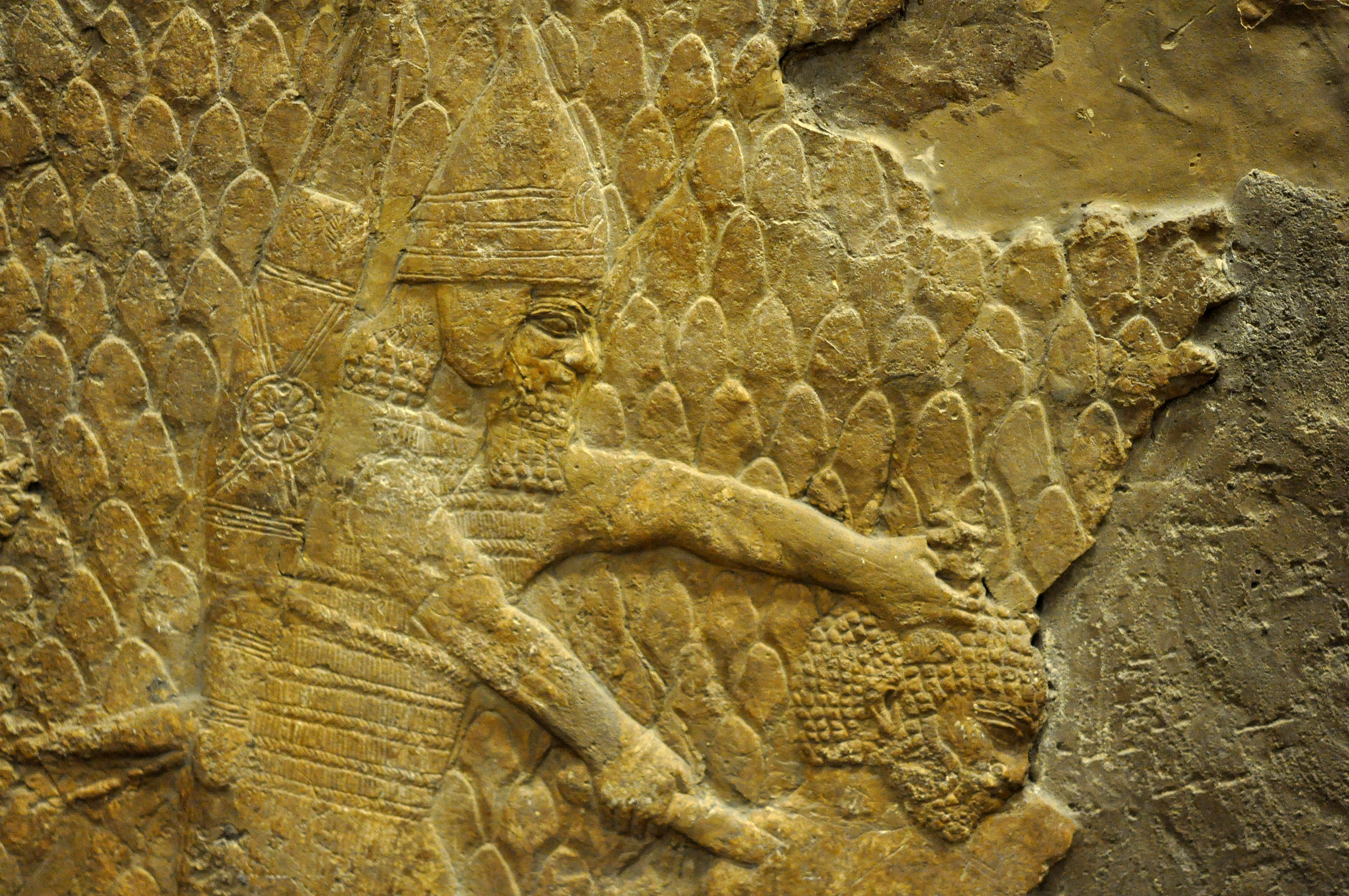
Assyrian soldier, using a dagger, about to behead a prisoner from the city of Lachish. Detail of a wall relief dating back to the reign of Sennacherib, 700–692 BC. From Nineveh, Iraq, currently housed in the British Museum

- Spears consisting of a wooden shaft tipped with a lethal iron spearhead; 5 feet long altogether
- Iron swords for fighting in close range
- Daggers for slitting throats with a secondary hand
- Javelins to break shields and for medium range thrown spears

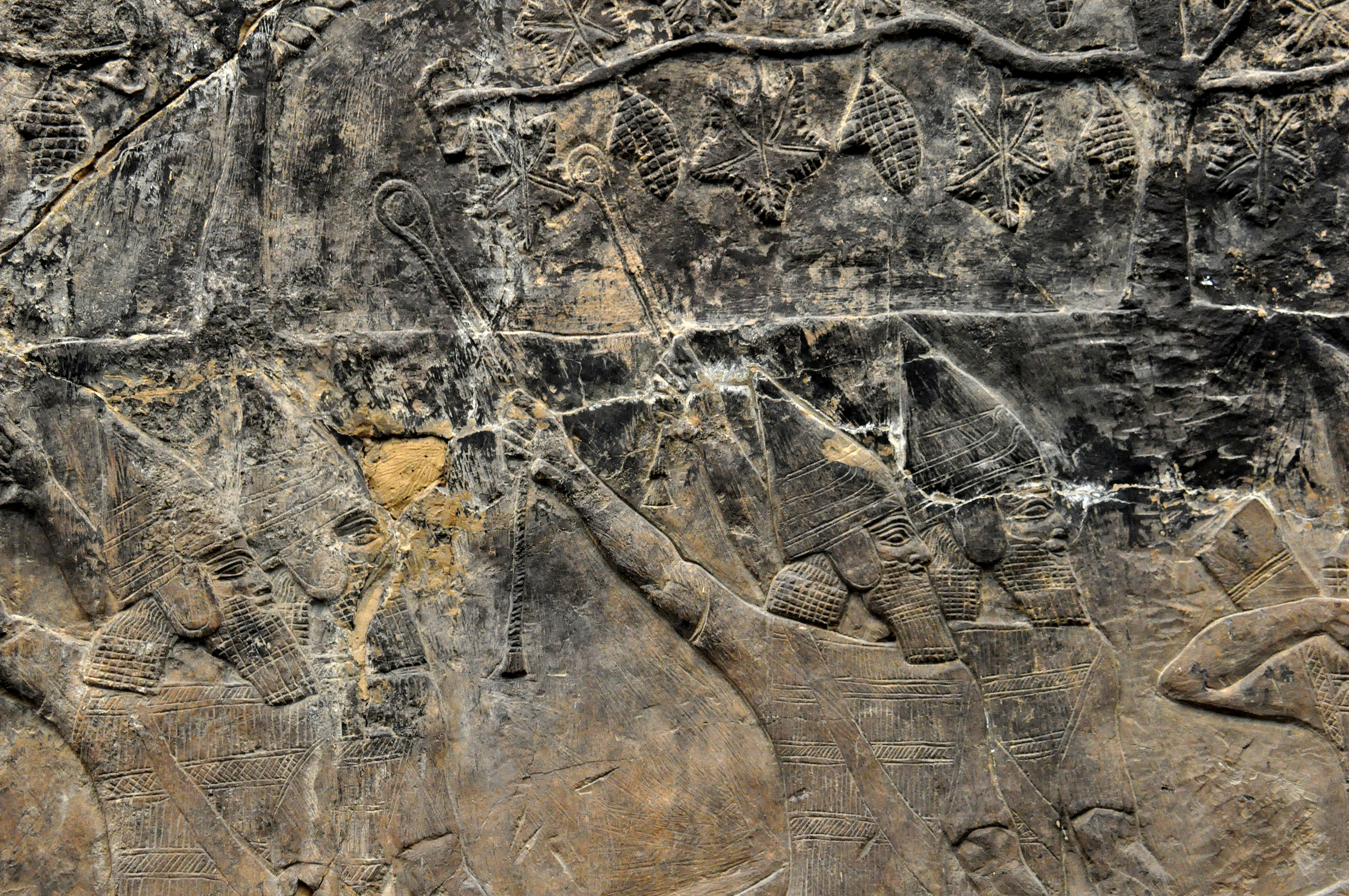
Assyria slingers hurling stones towards the enemy at the city of -alammu. Detail of a wall relief dating back to the reign of Sennacherib, 700–692 BC. From Nineveh, Iraq, currently housed in the British Museum

- Slings to hurl stones at enemies
- Bow and arrow was a ranged weapon used to attack from afar

=== Chariots ===
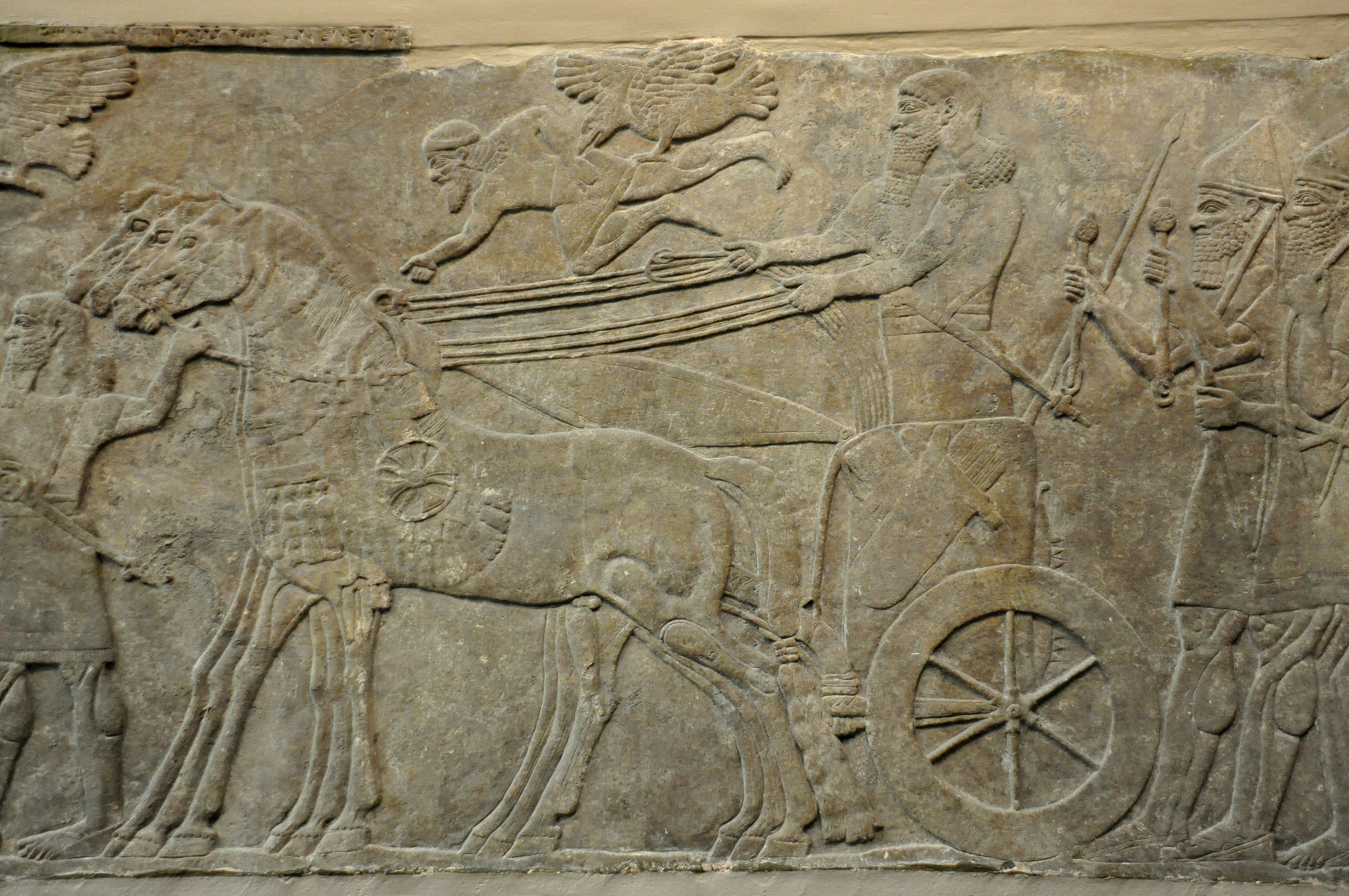
Assyrian war chariot dating back to the reign of Ashurnasirpal II, 865–860 BC. Detail of a gypsum wall relief from Nimrud, currently housed in the British Museum

The core of the Assyrian army lay in its chariots. The chariot was a fast and extremely maneuverable vessel. The use of chariots in warfare resembled a well disciplined army that dominated the battlefield in flanking maneuvers, causing opposing forces to divide or flee the battlefield. Chariots usually consisted of two or three horses, a platform with two wheels, and two soldiers. One soldier would have control of the reins to steer while the other wielded a bow and arrow to fire at enemy troops. The use of chariots is limited to a relatively flat battleground, making it effective in certain locations. The Ancient Egyptians and Sumerians used war chariots in this fashion as firing mobile platforms or as mobile command platforms; the elevated view would give the general some ability to see how the troops fared in battle. Because the chariot was fast and easily maneuverable, an alternative use for chariots was to send messages to and from the battlefield. They were also a prestigious vessel used by Assyrian kings to display wealth and power.

However, the rise of cavalry in the 1st millennium BC meant that by the 7th century BC, the chariot was demoted to combat duties only; lighter chariots consisting of two to three horses were later upgraded under the reign of Ashurbanipal to heavy four-horse chariots. Such chariots could contain up to four men. Heavier chariots also found new roles, smashing into enemy formations and dispersing the infantry in the process. The Assyrian cavalry and infantry would then be able to exploit the gap and rout the enemy, thereby taking the battlefield.

=== Cavalry ===
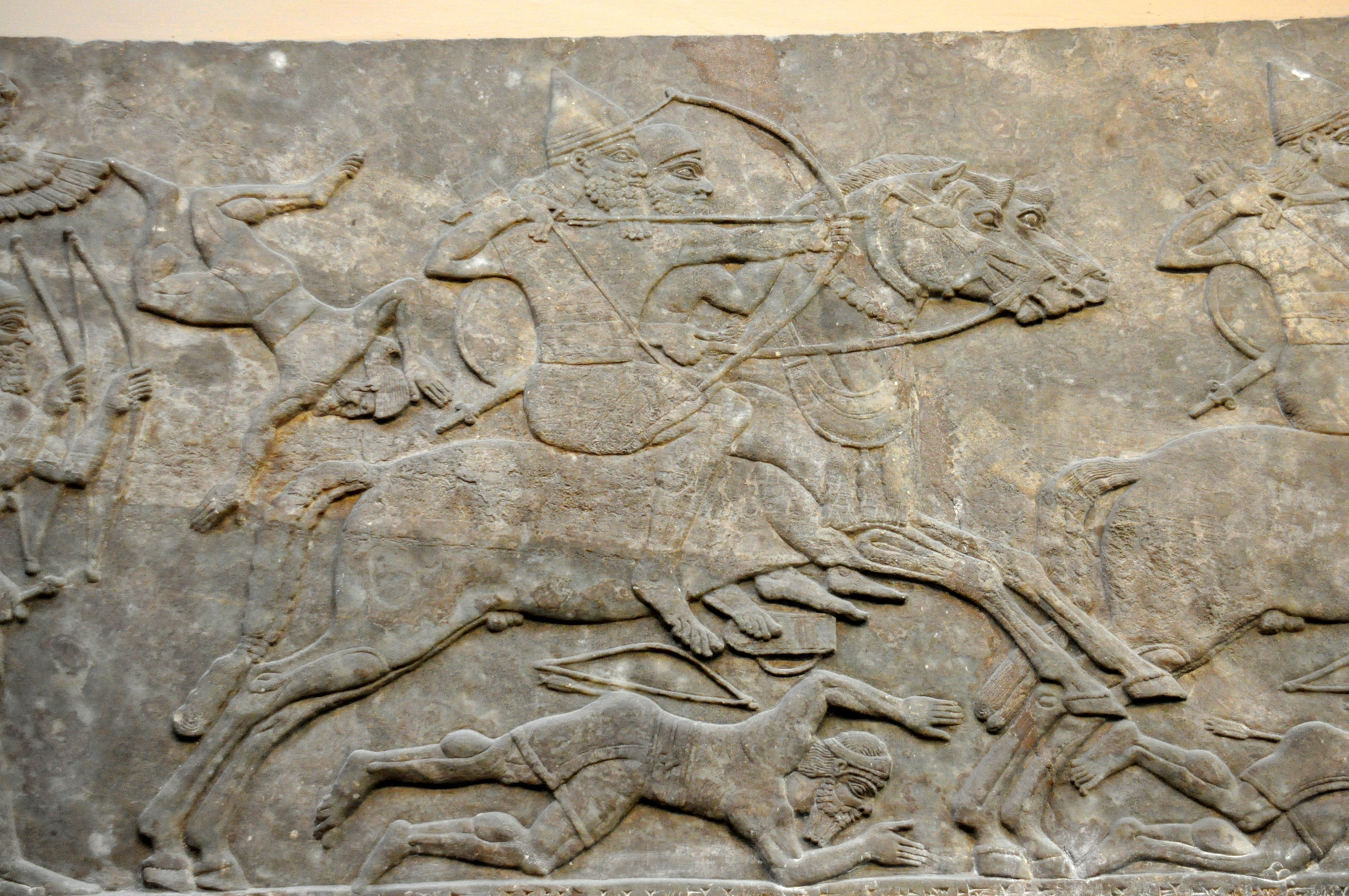
Assyrian cavalry charges the enemy, dating back to the reign of Ashurnasirpal II, 865–860 BC. In this period, cavalry was relatively new. Detail of a gypsum wall relief from Nimrud, currently housed in the British Museum

The use of cavalry was the result of having diverse enemies in rough and mountainous terrains. Chariots could not operate on rough terrain which meant that a new protocol needed to be developed. The cavalry operated as the chariot corps did, as an intimidating, well-armored, elite class of soldiers that could dominate the battlefield. Cavalry units were well equipped with light armor, spears or lances as well as bows and arrows. The use of the cavalry in the 9th century BC operated almost the same as the chariots did; two horses with one soldier controlling the reins while another soldier wielded a ranged weapon. Over the course of nearly two centuries, the Assyrians were able to master the art of the cavalry. However, Assyrian attempts were not without difficulties; horse archers were used but could not use their bows and the reins of their horses at the same time. As a result, cavalry under Ashurnasirpal are depicted in pairs, with one rider holding both reins and the other shooting with a bow. The Assyrians experienced fewer problems with cavalry when they were deployed as lancers; under Tiglath-Pileser III, the Assyrian cavalry continued to be paired, but this time each warrior held his own lance and controlled his own horse. By the 7th century BC, mounted Assyrian warriors were well armed with a bow and a lance, and armored with lamellar armour, while their mounts were equipped with fabric armour, providing limited yet useful protection in close combat and against missiles. Cavalry were to form the core of the later Assyrian armies. Cavalry could dominate the battlefields but their one weakness when attempting to divide enemy troops would have been long spears. Long spears were capable of eliminating cavalry units from a safe distance, allowing enemy troops to hold the line.

Cavalry were rarely used by the Assyrians or many other Mesopotamians until the 9th century BC, when their use is mentioned during the reign of Tukulti-Ninurta II. Before then, many nomads or steppe warriors who raided Assyrian lands relied on cavalry. The Assyrians had to counter this mobile form of warfare and so beat their opponents, notably the Iranians, at their own game. Perhaps the greatest outside influence was that of the Iranian Medes. The raiding by that people assisted Assyrian attempts in building a cavalry army with which to destroy the Kingdom of Elam.

Large units of cavalry were required to be deployed by the Assyrians; some units consisted of hundreds or even a thousand horsemen. There is little doubt that without a continuous supply of horses, the Assyrian war machine would have collapsed. As the empire suffered horrendous casualties under Ashurbanipal's campaigns of conquest, the rebellions following his death may have contributed significantly to the downfall of the empire as fewer vassals were available to pay tribute horses and other war material needed. Horses were a very important war resource and the Assyrian king himself took a personal interest in overseeing an adequate horse supply. Three main sources of horses were:

- Raids designed to steal horses from opponents, such as the Scythians or other steppe peoples.
- Tribute paid by vassal states.
- High-ranking state officers overseeing horse production and reporting to the King.

Horses were drawn from outlying provinces and brought in to be trained with new recruits for war.

=== Infantry ===
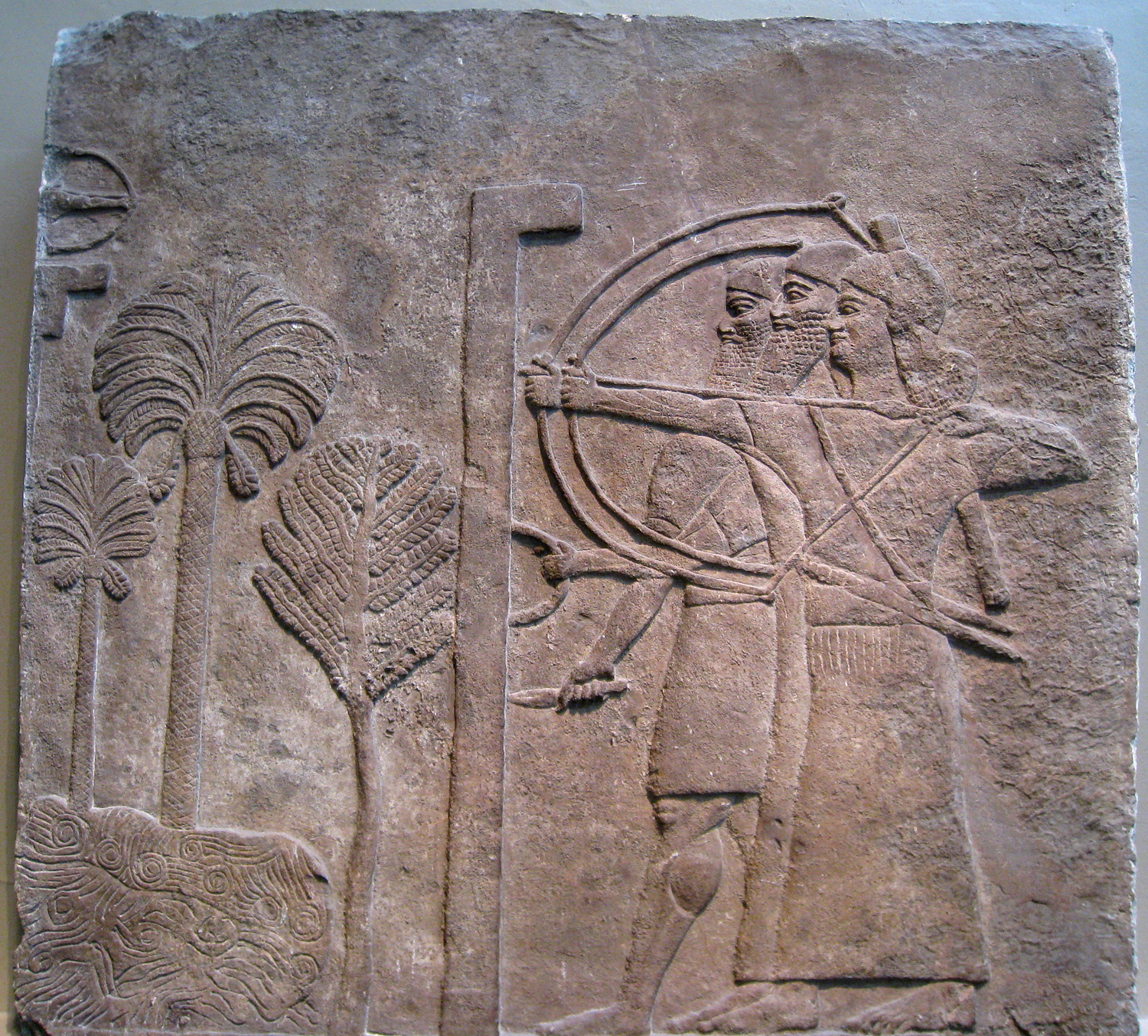
Assyrian archers taking aim, under the protection of a shield bearer.

While cavalry provided the most expensive and elite arm of the Assyrian Empire, infantry were cheaper and more numerous. Often, they were also more effective, for example in siege warfare, where the mobility provided by horsemen would be of no advantage. Assyrian infantry were composed of both native Assyrians and foreigners employed as auxiliaries, spearmen, slingers, shield bearers or archers. The latter type was the most dominant in Assyrian armies. From the time of Ashurnasirpal, archers would be accompanied by a shield bearer while slingers might have aimed to distract the enemy into lowering their shield to protect against the stones, thereby allowing the archers to shoot above their shield walls and kill their enemies. Even in siege warfare, arrows were used to drive back defenders from the wall while engineers advanced against the fortifications.

Many different types of bows are recorded by the Assyrians, including Akkadian, Cimmerian and their own "Assyrian" type. However, it is most likely that these were simply different variants of the powerful composite bow. Depending upon the bow, an archer would have a range of anything between 250 and 650 meters. Vast numbers of arrows could be expended in battle so in preparation for war many arrows would be made. Facilities also existed that would travel with the army's supply train that could manufacture more arrows.

Lancers were introduced to the infantry under Tiglath-pileser III. Depictions of infantry with special bronze scale metal protection are rare and reconstructions show the smallest vests to weigh as much as 20 pounds (9 kg), with armoured suits up to the ankles tripling that weight of metal and leather.

== Strategy and tactics ==
=== Tactics ===
From The Historians' History of the World : "The spear of the Assyrian footman was short, scarcely exceeding the height of a man; that of the horseman appears to have been considerably longer… The shaft was probably of some strong wood, and did not consist of a reed, like that of the modern Arab lance."

At the command of the god Ashur, the great Lord, I rushed upon the enemy like the approach of a hurricane...I put them to rout and turned them back. I transfixed the troops of the enemy with javelins and arrows. Humban-undasha, the commander in chief of the king of Elam, together with his nobles...I cut their throats like sheep...My prancing steeds, trained to harness, plunged into their welling blood as into a river; the wheels of my battle chariot were bespattered with blood and filth. I filled the plain with corpses of their warriors like herbage

— Sennacherib

Assyrian frontal assaults were designed to shock the enemy and surprise them. However, they were also a strategy employed when time was not on their side:

The harassed troops of Ashur, who had come a long way, very weary slow to respond, who had crossed and re-crossed sheer mountains innumerable, of great trouble for ascent and descent, their morale turned mutinous. I could give no ease to their weariness, no water to quench their thirst; I could set up no camp, nor fix defences

— Sargon II

Despite the above, Sargon II's instinct saved the day; leading his exhausted troops, he launched a surprise attack against his Urartian opponents who broke at the speed and surprise of the attack. So vicious was the battle that the Urartian King abandoned his state officials, governors, 230 members of the royal family, many cavalry and infantry, and even the capital itself.

=== Overall war strategy ===
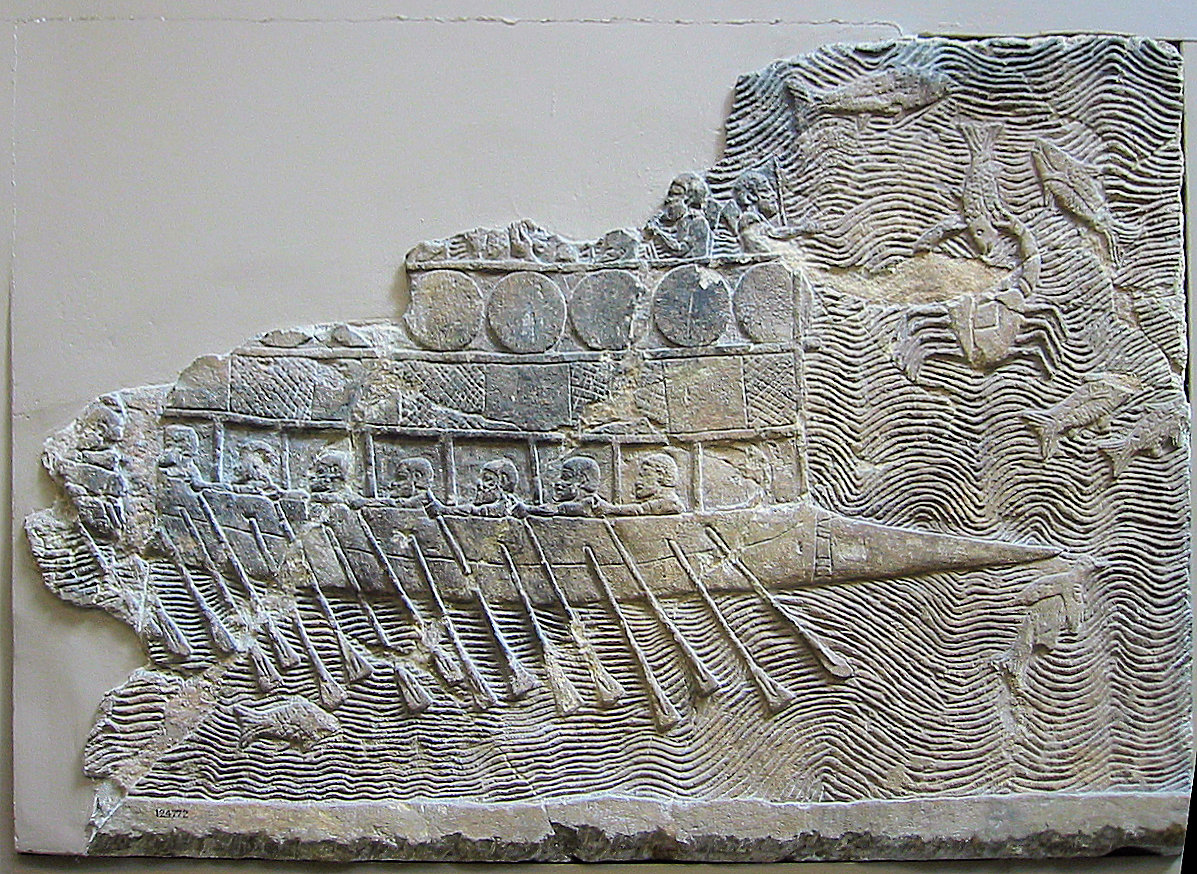
Assyrian warships. The Assyrians would have used these to transport horses, chariots and supplies across rivers. Although they reached the Mediterranean on numerous occasions, rebellions in the Fertile Crescent would have made such sea ventures into the Mediterranean unlikely.

The nature of Mesopotamia, plain and fertile with few natural defenses, meant that defensive operations were out of the question; only a decisive attack could defend such vulnerable yet valuable locations. The cities of Assur and Nineveh were both sandwiched between rivers; Nineveh was more enclosed and protected by the Tigris, while Assur, while being close to the Tigris, was a fair distance away from the Euphrates. The result was that both cities had a measure of natural protection. However, rivers would not stop a determined army, so attacking and destroying their enemies' ability to wage war was the best method of ensuring the survival of the Assyrians. To this end, the Assyrians sought a decisive encounter that would destroy their enemies' armies.

Colonization: The Assyrians, in conjunction with their deportation policies (see below), would also send some of their own into foreign lands and settle them as colonists. The primary aim was to establish a loyal power base; taxes, food and troops could be raised here as reliably as at their homeland, or at least that must have been the hope. Furthermore, their presence would bring innumerable benefits: resistance to other conquerors, a counter to any rebellions by the natives and assisting the provincial Assyrian governors in ensuring that the vassal state was loyal to Assyria.

Destruction of cities: One must be careful before assuming that the Assyrians utilized total war. However, it is known that the Assyrians, as part of their overall strategy of weakening their opponents and of exacting revenge, would violently destroy what they could not take back or could not consolidate. Regarding the Assyrian conquest of Elam, Ashurbanipal recorded:

For a distance of a month and twenty-five days' journey I devastated the provinces of Elam. Salt and sihlu I scattered over them... The dust of Susa, Madaktu, Haltemash and the rest of the cities I gathered together and took to Assyria... The noise of people, the tread of cattle and sheep, the glad shouts of rejoicing, I banished from its fields. Wild asses, gazelles and all kinds of beasts of the plain I caused to lie down among them, as if at home.

— Ashurbanipal

== Psychological warfare ==
The Assyrians fully appreciated the use of terrorizing their enemies. To conserve manpower and rapidly move on to solve Assyria's multiple problems, the Assyrians preferred to accept the surrender of their opponents or else destroy their ability to resist a surrender. This in part explains their offensive strategy and tactics.

=== Deportations ===
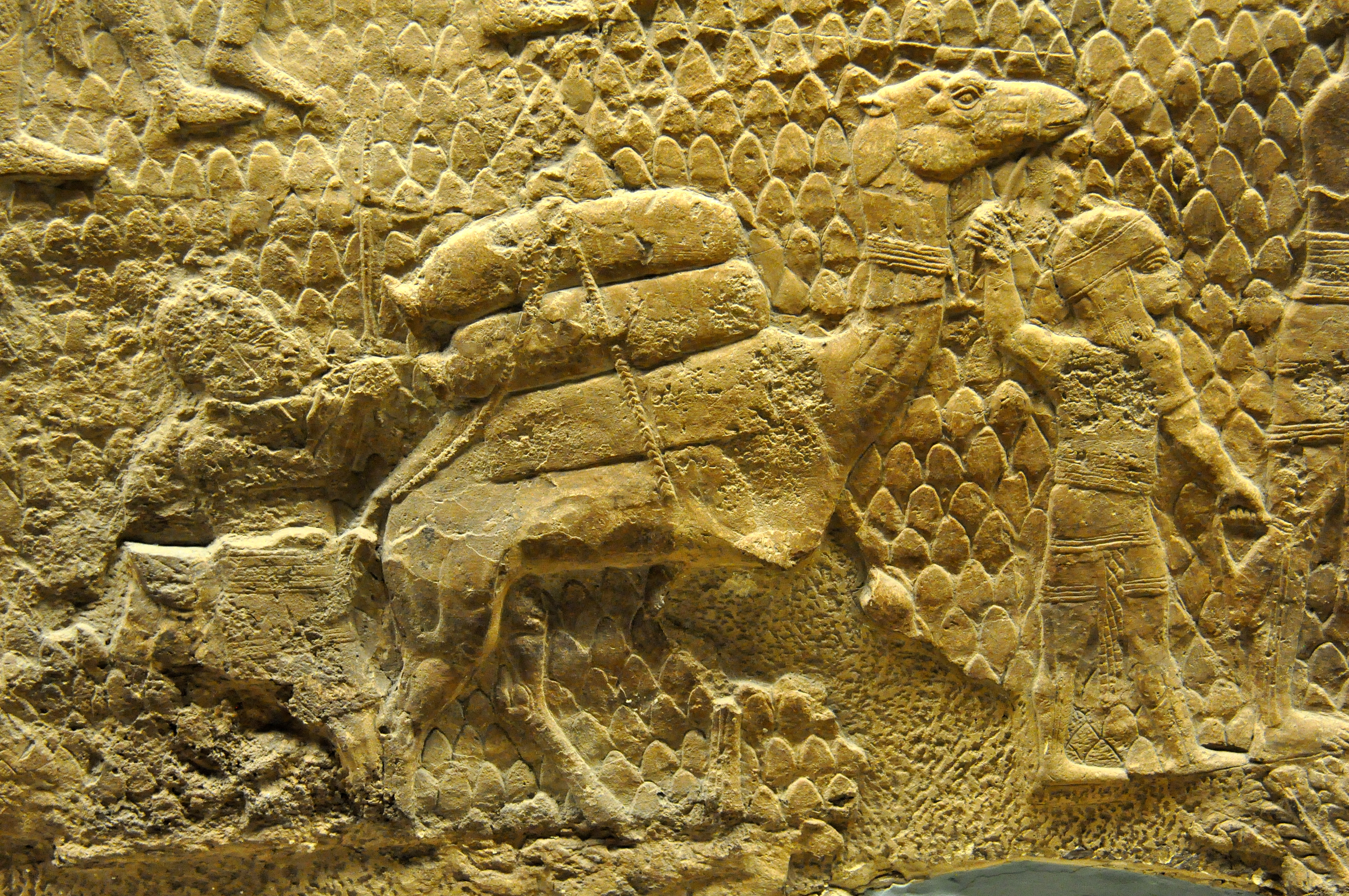
Detail of a gypsum wall relief depicting the deportation of the inhabitants of the city of Lachish by the Assyrian army. Reign of Sennacherib, 700–692 BC, from Nineveh, Iraq, currently housed in the British Museum

The Israelites were one of the many peoples deported by the Assyrians.

It is not known if the Assyrians were the first to deport people, although since none before had ruled the Fertile Crescent as they did it is likely that they were the first to practice it on a large scale. The Assyrians began to utilize mass-deportation as a punishment for rebellions since the 13th century BC. The purposes of deportation included, but were not limited to:

1) Psychological warfare: the possibility of deportation would have terrorized the people;
2) Integration: a multi-ethnic population base in each region would have curbed nationalist sentiment, making the running of the Empire smoother;
3) Preservation of human resources: rather than being butchered, the people could serve as slave labor or as conscripts in the army.

By the 9th century BC, the Assyrians made it a habit of regularly deporting thousands of restless subjects to other lands. Re-settling these people in the Assyrian homeland would have undermined the powerbase of the Assyrian Empire if they rebelled again. As a result, Assyrian deportation involved removing one enemy population and settling them into another. Below is a list of deportations carried out by Assyrian Kings:

- 744 BC: Tiglath Pileser III deports 65,000 people from Iran to the Assyrian-Babylonian border at the Diyala river
- 742 BC: Tiglath Pileser III deports 30,000 people from Hamath, Syria and into the Zagros mountains in the east.
- 721 BC: Sargon II (claimed) deports 27,290 people from Samaria, Israel and disperses them throughout the Empire. However, it is likely that his now deceased predecessor, Shalmaneser V ordered the deportation. (Babylonian chronicles state that Shalmaneser became king on the 25th day of the month Tebeth, following Tiglath-Pileser's death, and that he died in the month of Tebeth in his fifth year as king.)
- 707 BC: Sargon II deports 108,000 Chaldeans and Babylonians from the Babylonian region
- 703 BC: Sennacherib deports 208,000 people from Babylon

Tiglath Pileser III re-introduced deportation on a grand scale, deporting tens, even hundreds of thousands of people. Deportations were also coupled with colonization; see above for more details.

=== Dealing with rebels ===
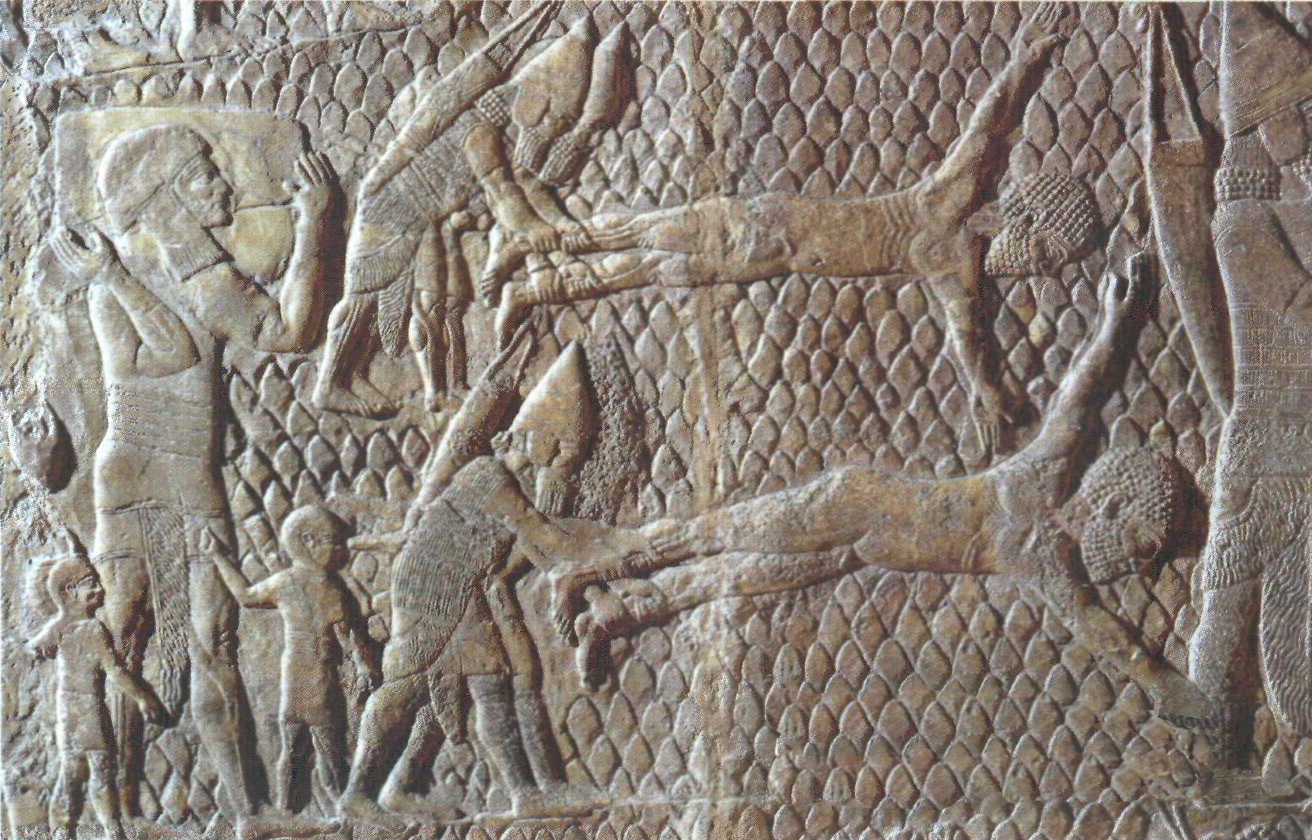
Assyrians flaying their prisoners alive

Whenever a rebellion broke out in the Assyrian empire, the Assyrian kings inevitably brutally crushed it (as an alternative to deportation) and enforced great punishments on the rebellious vassals. Tiglath-Pileser III, for example, destroyed Bit-Shilani so that it could look like a city destroyed by the Deluge. Afterwards, he impaled Nabonassar, the city's king, and forced survivors to watch.

Ashurnasirpal II assured that the rebellions whom he encountered would be crushed with the same cruelty so that his opponents would never do it again. In one of his expeditions, Ashurnasirpal II described how he faced the rebels, in which they were being flayed, impaled, decapitated, or burned alive:

I felled 3,000 of their fighting men with the sword. I carried off prisoners, possessions, oxen, [and] cattle from them. I burnt many captives from them. I captured many troops alive: from some I cut off their arms [and] hands; from others I cut off their noses, ears, [and] extremities. I gouged out the eyes of many troops. I made one pile of the living (and) one of heads. I hung their heads on trees around the city, I burnt their adolescent boys [and] girls. I razed, destroyed, burnt, [and] consumed the city.

— Ashurnasirpal II

The brutal treatment of Ashurnasirpal II succeeded in pacifying the rebels. While campaigning in Syria, he was able to take a large number of soldiers from Mesopotamia, without fear of a rebellion cutting off their supply lines. They were so successful in their brutality in the northern cities of Syria in that many of the smaller settlements were immediately handed over to their troops, then they marched south in parallel of the Mediterranean.

The Assyrians considered their kings as ruling with the gods’ (or the god Ashur) sanction. To rebel against this most humble servant of Ashur, it means defying Ashur himself, something that could only bring divine destruction; therefore, the glorification of such brutality. Brutality was also a way to show the king's strength and power, which were considered to be heroic traits.

Other acts of brutality include: mutilating men to death, cutting off heads, arms, hands and lips and displaying them on the walls of conquered cities, hanging skulls and noses on the top of stakes, stacking or cutting corpses so that it could be fed to dogs and forcing people whose eyes were blinded to publicly roam so that natives would be demoralized.

== Siege warfare ==
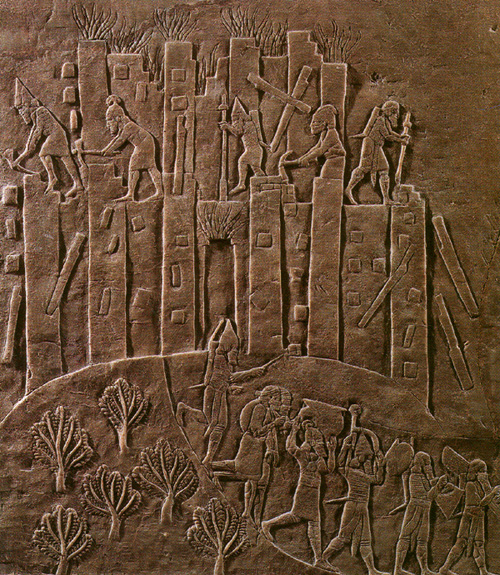
Hamanu, sacked by the Assyrians. Ashurbanipal's brutal campaign against Elam in 647 BC is triumphantly recorded in this relief. Here, flames rise from the city as Assyrian soldiers topple it with pickaxes and crowbars and carry off the spoils.

In 647 BC, the Assyrian king Assurbanipal leveled the city during a war in which the people of Susa apparently participated on the other side. A tablet unearthed in 1854 by Austen Henry Layard in Nineveh reveals Ashurbanipal as an "avenger", seeking retribution for the humiliations the Elamites had inflicted on the Mesopotamians over the centuries. Ashurbanipal dictates Assyrian retribution after his successful siege of Susa:

Susa, the great holy city, abode of their gods, seat of their mysteries, I conquered. I entered its palaces, I opened their treasuries where silver and gold, goods and wealth were amassed... I destroyed the ziggurat of Susa. I smashed its shining copper horns. I reduced the temples of Elam to naught; their gods and goddesses I scattered to the winds. The tombs of their ancient and recent kings I devastated, I exposed to the sun, and I carried away their bones toward the land of Ashur. I devastated the provinces of Elam and on their lands I sowed salt.

— Ashurbanipal

The plains and fertile lands of Mesopotamia were not only ideal for warfare but actually attracted war. Raiders from all nations coveted the lands of the Assyrians: Scythians to the north, Syrians, Arameans and Cimmerians to the West, Elamites to the East and Babylonians to the south. In fact, the latter never tired of rebelling against Assyrian rule. As a result, in order to prevent chariots and cavalry from completely overwhelming these settlements, walls were constructed though often from mud or clay since stone was neither cheap, nor readily available. In order to destroy the opponents, these cities had to be taken as well and so the Assyrians soon mastered siege warfare; Esarhaddon claims to have taken Memphis, the capital of Egypt in less than a day, demonstrating the ferocity and skill of Assyrian siege tactics at this point in time:

I fought daily, without interruption against Taharqa, King of Egypt and Ethiopia, the one accursed by all the great gods. Five times I hit him with the point of my arrows inflicting wounds from which he should not recover, and then I laid siege to Memphis his royal residence, and conquered it in half a day by means of mines, breaches and assault ladders

— Esarhaddon

Sieges were costly in terms of manpower and more so if an assault was launched to take the city by force—the siege of Lachish cost the Assyrians at least 1,500 men found at a mass grave near Lachish. Before the advent of standing armies, a city's best hope would be that the harvest would force the enemy to return to their fields and therefore abandon the city. However, with the reforms of Tiglath Pileser III Assyria's first standing army was forged and could therefore blockade a city until it surrendered instead. Nonetheless, it is known that Assyrians always preferred to take a city by assault than to settle down for a blockade: the former method would be followed by extermination or deportation of the inhabitants and would therefore frighten the opponents of Assyria into surrendering as well.

=== Siege weapons ===
The most common siege weapon and by far the cheapest was the ladder. However, ladders are easy to topple over and so the Assyrians would shower their opponents with arrows to provide cover fire. These archers in turn would be supported by shield bearers. Other ways of undermining the enemies' defences included mining. A 9th-century Assyrian relief depicts soldiers using ladders to scale walls, while others use their spears to scrape the mud and clay from the walls. A soldier is also depicted beneath a wall, suggesting that mining was used to undermine the foundations and bring the walls down on their opponents.

The battering ram appears to be one of the best Assyrian contributions to siege warfare. They consisted of a tank-like wooden frame on four wheels. There was a small tower on top for archers to provide covering fire as the engine moved forward. When it had reached its destination, its primary weapon, a large spear, was used to batter away and chip pieces of the enemy wall. While this would have been almost useless against stone walls, one must keep in mind that mud and not stone was used to build walls. Even when dried, these mud walls could be attacked with such engines. Walls were strengthened with time and the Assyrians responded by building larger engines with bigger "spears". In time, they closely resembled a large and long log with a metal tip at the end. Even stone would not withstand pounding by a larger weapon. Larger engines accommodated greater numbers of archers. To protect against fire (which was used by both sides at the Siege of Lachish) the battering ram would be covered in wet animal skins. These could be watered at any time in battle in case they dried.

I captured 46 towns... by consolidating ramps to bring up battering rams, by infantry attacks, mines, breaches and siege engines

— Sennacherib

Siege towers, even ones that could float were reported to have been in use whenever there was a wall facing a river.

- Video on The Assyrian assault on Lachish and a water tunnel in Jerusalem.

== Timeline ==
=== 3rd and 2nd millennia BC ===
- 2340–2284 BC Sargon of Akkad conquers much of Mesopotamia
- 1230 BC Battle of Nairi
- 1170 BC Nineveh at its peak power and influence

=== 9th century BC ===
Cavalry use first recorded by Tukulti Ninurta II

- 883 BC Ashurnasirpal II takes power and begins expansion of Assyria beyond Mesopotamia
- 877 BC Ashurnasirpal II takes Assyrian troops to the Mediterranean and Mount Lebanon for the first time.
- 858 BC Shalmaneser III subjugates Bit Adini to vassal status
- 853 BC After taking Aleppo, Shalmaneser III is stopped at the Battle of Qarqar
- 851 BC Shalmaneser III defeats Chaldean revolt in Babylon
- 849, 845 and 841 BC Shalmaneser III makes three unsuccessful attempts to take Syria
- 840 BC Shalmaneser III fails to defeat Urartu
- 832 BC Shalmaneser III fails to take Damascus in a siege
- 824 BC Shalmaneser III dies, Assyria enters into period of weakness

=== 8th century BC ===
- 780–756 BC Argistis I reigns over Assyria, lake Urmia lost by Assyria to Urartu
- 745 BC Tiglath Pileser III seizes power in a coup; Assyrian Army reformed
- 744 BC Mass deportation of Iranians by Tiglath Pileser III
- Unknown date: Tiglath Pileser III defeats Babylon
- 743 BC Tiglath Pileser III decisively defeats Urartu, besieges Arpad
- 741 BC Arpad falls to Tiglath Pileser III
- 734–732 BC Syro-Ephraimite War: Rebellions in Syria and Palestine are crushed. Damascus falls in 732.
- 732 BC Babylon is conquered by Assyria following an usurpation of the throne by a Chaldean. Lands around Babylon are devastated during three years of fighting
- 724–722 BC Shalmaneser V besieges and then captures Samaria
- 721 BC Coup of Sargon II results in Samaria revolt; it is quickly crushed.
- 721 BC Sargon II defeats Babylonian rebellion
- 717–716 BC Sargon II takes Carchemish to secure trade routes in the north.
- 714 BC A major military disaster befalls Urartu; Sargon II destroys Urartu's ability to fight forever
- 713 BC Rumours of an anti-Assyrian alliance leads Sargon II to take Tabal.
- 710–707 BC Another Babylonian revolt is crushed by Sargon II
- 709 BC Assyrian expeditionary forces sent by Sargon II force Midas to seek peace terms.
- 703 BC Another Chaldean-backed Babylon revolt is crushed by Sennacherib, only one year after his succession
- 701 BC Sennacherib moves down Mediterranean coast to subdue Syria and Israel. Lachish is taken after bloody fighting, while Egyptian aid is driven back. Siege of Jerusalem fails.

=== 7th century BC ===
- 694 BC Sennacherib attacks Elam. Elam attacks Babylon, which is now unoccupied by Assyrian army
- 693 BC Battle of Diyala River: Assyrian assault to Elam through Der is called back due to Babylonian revolt
- 692 BC Battle of Halule: The alliance of Elamites, Babylonians, Chaldeans, and Aramaic and Zagros tribes fight off the Assyrians.
- 691 BC Sennacherib wins a Pyrrhic victory against Elam. However he is able to crush the Babylon revolt
- 681 BC Sennacherib is murdered by two of his sons; another son Esarhaddon avenges his death and rules Assyria
- 679 BC An alliance of Cimmerians and Scythians is defeated by Esarhaddon's forces.
- 679 BC Esarhaddon's troops take Arzani and reach the Egyptian border.
- 676 BC Esarhaddon launches an offensive to counter increasing Iranian power.
- 675 BC An assault on Egypt is thrown back.
- 671 BC Another Assyrian offensive into Egypt is a success;
- 669 BC Memphis is sacked by Assyrian troops
- 668 BC Ashurbanipal succeeds Esarhhadon, last King of Assyria to expand her borders beyond Mesopotamia
- 665 BC A ten-year campaign against Media is launched.
- 665 BC Elam attacks Babylon, but fails.
- 663 BC Ashurbanipal relieves an Egyptian siege of Memphis and destroys Thebes in the south.
- 655 BC Elam attacks Babylon. At the same time, Egypt launches another offensive. Elamite attack repelled by large Assyrian army assembled by Ashurbanipal.
- Unknown date (possibly 655 BC) Ashurbanipal drives Elmite forces across the River Ulai in the plain of Susa.
- 653 BC Median invasion stopped by Scythian attack
- 652 BC Babylon once more revolts
- 651 BC Ashurbanipal abandons Egypt to focus on Elamite attacks; Assyrian army shows signs of overstretching itself.
- 648 BC Babylon is utterly destroyed by Assyria; Elamite civil war ensures no help from Elam.
- 647 BC Battle of Susa: Susa is destroyed completely by Ashurbanipal.
- 639 BC Ashurbanipal devastates the lands of Elam. Elamite kingdom does not recover.

Collapse of Assyria

- 635 BC Egypt, unchecked since 651 BC, storms Ashdod.
- 627 BC Ashurbanipal dies. Collapse of Assyria accelerates.
- 622 BC An Assyrian expedition may have been launched west of the Euphrates; lack of Assyrian records points to a likely Assyrian defeat.
- 616 BC Nabopolassar, King of Babylon since 626 BC, drives out Assyrian troops from Babylonia.
- 615 BC Median invasion of Assyria results in capture of Arrapḫa.
- 614 BC Assur, first capital of Assyria is sacked by the Medes under King Cyaxares.
- 612 BC Battle of Nineveh (612 BC): Nineveh is destroyed by an alliance of Medians and Babylonians after a mere 3-month siege.
- 609 BC Battle of Megiddo (609 BC): Egyptians unsuccessfully try to help the Assyrians.
- 609 BC Fall of Harran: Newly established Assyrian capital at Harran is destroyed by pursuing Median and Babylonian forces.

== See also ==
- Ancient warfare
- Assyrian Levies
- List of artifacts significant to the Bible
- Military history of Egypt
- Military history of Iran
- Military history of Iraq
- Syro-Ephraimite War
- Medo-Babylonian conquest of the Assyrian Empire
