= Baliḫu =

Iron Age town on the Euphrates in modern-day Syria

Baliḫu, also known as Ba-li-ih and Balaṭ-šarrani, is an ancient Iron Age town on the Euphrates in northern Syria.

According to the Harran Census tablets (SAA XI 122–45), the city was located in the Balikh River Basin. The ruins of the town are believed by some to be at Tell Abyad (Arabic: تل أبيض,) on the Syria–Turkey border.

== History ==
The town is mentioned in a chronicle of Aššur-uballit II, known as Chronicle 3, which states that the Battle of Nineveh between Babylonian and Assyrian armies in the month Âbu the king of Akkad and his army went upstream to Mane, Sahiri and Bali-hu. He plundered them, sacked them extensively and abducted their gods.

It may have been a semi independent kingdom, though this is controversial and a governor of the city is known for 814 BC. Shalmaneser III claims that in 853, he advanced on the city and that the inhabitants fearful of his approach assassinated their overlord Giammu and surrendered. At some time latter in the rule of Shalamaneser, a general Belu-lu-balat, claimed to be gorvenor of the town.
