= Fall of Tarbiṣu =

627 BC battle

- Part of Medo-Babylonian conquest of the Assyrian Empire
Date	614 BC
Location	Tarbiṣu
Result	Median victory

Belligerents
Media	Assyria

Commanders and leaders
Cyaxares	Sin-Shar-Ishkun

Strength
Unknown	Unknown

Casualties and losses
Unknown	Unknown

After the death of Assurbanipal in 627 BC, the Neo-Assyrian empire entered a period of instability caused by fighting between Sin-shar-ishkun and his brother Assur-etil-ilani. In 626 BC, Nabopolassar, the Babylonian ruler revolted against the Assyrians. After a few years of war, the Babylonians expelled the Assyrian forces from their territory. However, Nabopolassar could not bring the fight to the heartland of the Assyrian empire. The situation changed drastically in 616 BC, when the Medes attacked the Assyrian empire. The fall of Tarbiṣu occurred when the Median army, led by Cyaxares, attacked and conquered the city. In the aftermath, the Medes went further and decisively defeated the Assyrians at the battle of Assur.
