= Battle of Megiddo (609 BC) =

Battle between Egypt and Judah

- Part of the Medo-Babylonian conquest of the Assyrian Empire
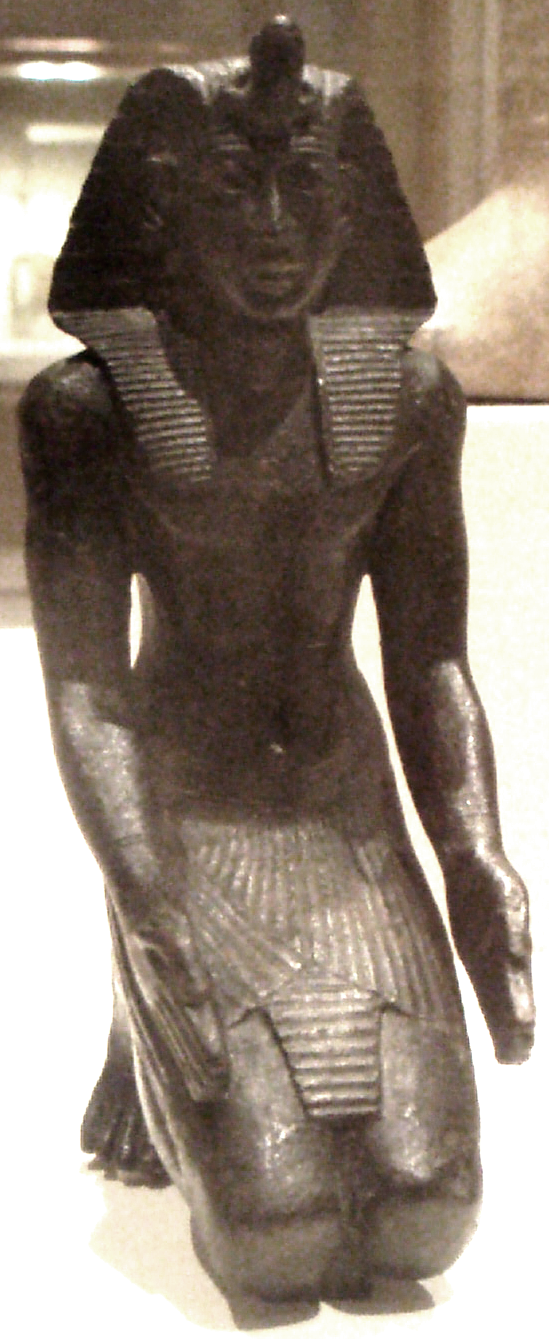
- A small kneeling bronze statuette, likely depicting the Egyptian pharaoh Necho II, currently on display at the Brooklyn Museum.
Date	June or July 609 BC
Location	Megiddo, Judah (now Israel) 32°35′N 35°11′E
Result	Egyptian victory
Territorial changes	Subjugation of Judah by Dynasty XXVI of Egypt (Note: There is evidence Judah was an Egyptian vassal before this encounter.)

Belligerents
Twenty-sixth Dynasty of Egypt	Kingdom of Judah

Commanders and leaders
Necho II	Josiah †

Strength
Unknown	Unknown

Casualties and losses
Undetermined	Undetermined
- Location within present-day Israel

This Battle of Megiddo is recorded as having taken place in 609 BC, when Pharaoh Necho II of Egypt led his army to Carchemish (northern Syria) to join with his allies, the fading Neo-Assyrian Empire, against the surging Neo-Babylonian Empire. This required passing through territory controlled by the Kingdom of Judah. The Judaean king Josiah refused to let the Egyptians pass. The Judaean forces battled the Egyptians at Megiddo, resulting in Josiah's death and his kingdom becoming a vassal state of Egypt. The battle is recorded in the Hebrew Bible, the Greek 1 Esdras, and the writings of Jewish historian Josephus.

While Necho II gained control of the Kingdom of Judah, the Assyrian forces lost to the Babylonians and Medes at the Fall of Harran, after which Assyria largely ceased to exist as an independent state.

== Biblical accounts ==
The basic story is told in 2 Kings 23:29–30 (written c. 550 BC). The Hebrew text here has been misunderstood and translated as Necho going "against" Assyria. Eric H. Cline noted that most modern translations try to improve this passage by taking into account what we now know from other historical sources, namely that Egypt and Assyria were then allies. The original text also does not mention a "battle", yet some modern versions add the word "battle" to the text.

In his days Pharaoh Neco king of Egypt went up to the king of Assyria to the river Euphrates. King Josiah went to meet him; and Pharaoh Neco slew him at Megiddo, when he saw him. And his servants carried him dead in a chariot from Megiddo, and brought him to Jerusalem, and buried him in his own tomb.

There is a longer account recorded later in II Chronicles 35:20–25 (written c. 400–300 BC).

After all this, when Josiah had set the temple in order, Neco king of Egypt came up to make war at Carchemish on the Euphrates, and Josiah went out to engage him. But Neco sent messengers to him, saying, "What have we to do with each other, O King of Judah? I am not coming against you today but against the house with which I am at war, and God has ordered me to hurry. Stop for your own sake from interfering with God who is with me, so that He will not destroy you." However, Josiah would not turn away from him, but disguised himself in order to make war with him; nor did he listen to the words of Neco from the mouth of God, but came to make war on the plain of Megiddo. The archers shot King Josiah, and the king said to his servants, "Take me away, for I am badly wounded." So his servants took him out of the chariot and carried him in the second chariot which he had, and brought him to Jerusalem where he died and was buried in the tombs of his fathers.

=== Debate over II Chronicles ===
Cline explained that there is a division of opinion as to the accuracy of the above account. On one side are the scholars who believe that it is an accurate report of a surprise attack by Josiah. On the other are those who point out that it would not be the only time the Chronicler "improved" a story. From being wounded by an arrow to his burial in Jerusalem, the story resembles perhaps too closely stories from I and II Kings about Ahab of Israel and Ahaziah of Judah, events which occurred at least two centuries before Josiah's death. Cline suggests that the Chronicler used details from these stories in Josiah's story.

Cline also suggests the possibility that there may not have been a historical battle of Megiddo involving Josiah since there is little historical attestation for it outside the Bible. For example, Josiah may have been killed by Necho in some other circumstances.

== Other accounts ==
=== Jewish ===
The account in Esdras adds some minor details, with the basic difference between it and the earlier account in the Book of Chronicles being that Josiah is described only as being 'weak' at Megiddo and asks to be taken back to Jerusalem, where he dies. Cline points out that this brings the story more in line with an earlier prophecy made by the prophetess Huldah (II Kings 22:15–20).

Seven centuries after Josiah's death, Josephus also wrote an account of the events. This contains more details about Josiah's movements on the battlefield, which have been suggested come from documents now lost, but Cline suggests it is based on the biblical accounts and perhaps Josephus's own views.

The battle is also discussed in the Talmud, where it says that Josiah did not let the Egyptians pass because of a passage in the Bible that says "A sword shall not pass through your land" (Leviticus 26:6 Taanit 22b)

Also mentioning the Battle is the Kinnah for the 9th of Av, "And Jeremiah lamented over Josiah" (Kinnah 11), which seems to give a vague picture of the battle. The Judeans held the high ground, atop the hill, where they attempted to shower the advancing Egyptians with arrows. The Judean "professional" infantry of the time seems to have been some sort of force of hand-to-hand combatants who were also equipped with bows. Egyptian chariots charging seems to have driven them back, whereupon the now-damaged Judean infantry was attacked by the Egyptian infantry. Desperately trying to maintain his men's morale, Josiah ordered his charioteer to position his chariot right behind his center. Although the Kerathites advised the King to retreat, Josiah adamantly refused. Seeing the Judean royal standard, the Egyptian archers focused on Josiah as a target, and though he was struck 300 times, only one arrow seems to have found its mark, possibly striking him under the left arm. Josiah is withdrawn from the battle, gravely wounded, and, seeing their king retreat, the Judean army loses hope as well, and a rout follows.

=== Greek ===
Finally, there is the suggestion that Herodotus records this battle and the Egyptian campaign in his writings about the pharaoh Necho, which are included in his famous Histories:

Necos, then, stopped work on the canal and turned to war; some of his triremes were constructed by the northern sea, and some in the Arabian Gulf, by the coast of the Sea of Erythrias. The windlasses for beaching the ships can still be seen. He deployed these ships as needed, while he also engaged in a pitched battle at Magdolos with the Syrians, and conquered them; and after this he took Cadytis, which is a great city of Syria. He sent the clothes he had worn in these battles to Branchidae of Miletus and dedicated them to Apollo.

== Location ==
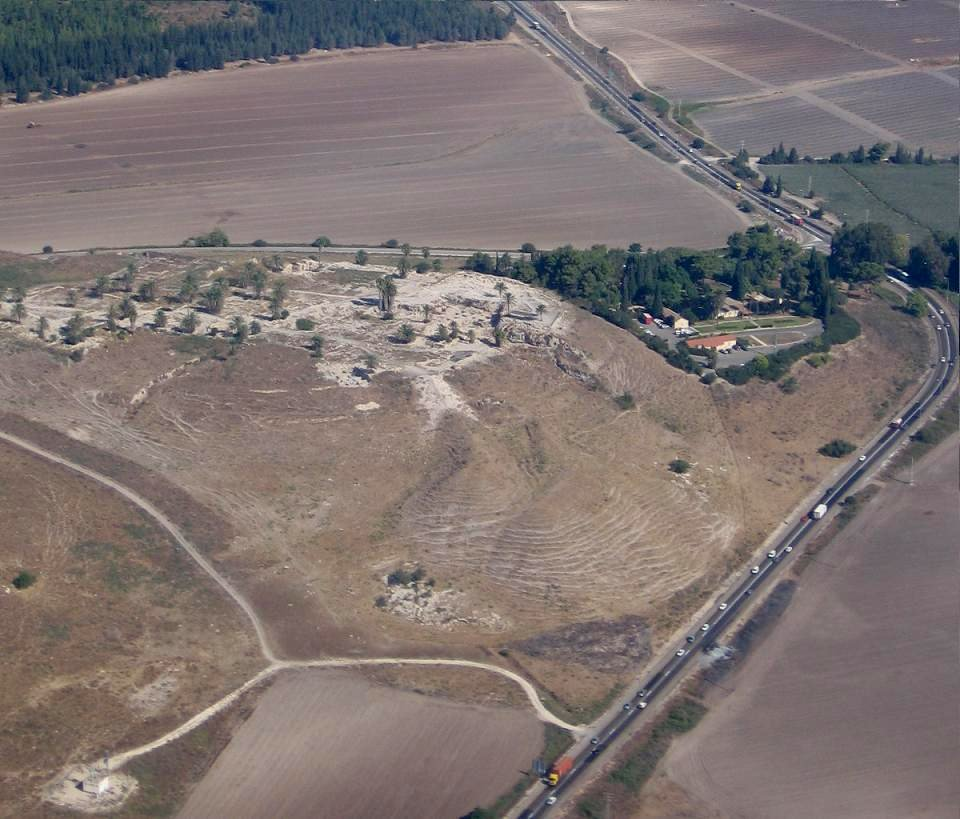
Aerial view of Tel Megiddo from the south east

A view at the topography of the place around the city reveals that Megiddo is a small rise among others on a small elevated plateau close to a large level coastal plain large enough to accommodate many thousands of troops. Since it does dominate the surrounding area, it is not an obvious target, but it is useful as a garrison and has a water source from the Kishon River. That explains why Josiah used the terrain to mask his approach as he attempted to ambush the Egyptian army that was on its way to attack the Babylonians in Mesopotamia.

== Aftermath ==
Judah fell under the control and influence of Dynasty XXVI of Egypt. On his return from Syria and Mesopotamia, the Egyptian pharaoh Necho II captured and deposed the Judean king Jehoahaz, the son of Josiah who had just succeeded his father on the throne. Necho enforced a tribute of 100 talents of silver (about 3 3/4 tons or about 3.4 metric tons) and a talent of gold (about 34 kilograms or 75 pounds) upon the Judeans, and appointed Jehoahaz' older brother Eliakim as king; Necho also renamed Eliakim to Jehoiakim. Jehoahaz was taken as a captive to Egypt, where he became the first king of Judah to die in exile.

== Archaeology ==
In level X-3 of the soil, relating to the 7th century BC, a large number of Egyptian-made ceramic vessels were found, as well as a significant number of ceramics from eastern Greece, usually interpreted as belonging to Greek mercenaries in the service of the 26th dynasty.

== See also ==
- Megiddo
- Fall of Harran
