= Fall of Harran =

Ancient battle

- Part of the Medo-Babylonian conquest of the Assyrian Empire
Date	610-609 BC
Location	Harran, Şanlıurfa, Turkey
Result	Medo-Babylonian victory; Fall of the Assyrian Empire

Belligerents
Neo-Babylonian Empire; Median Kingdom	Neo-Assyrian Empire

Commanders and leaders
Nabopolassar; Cyaxares	Ashur-uballit II

Strength
Unknown	Unknown

Casualties and losses
Unknown	Unknown

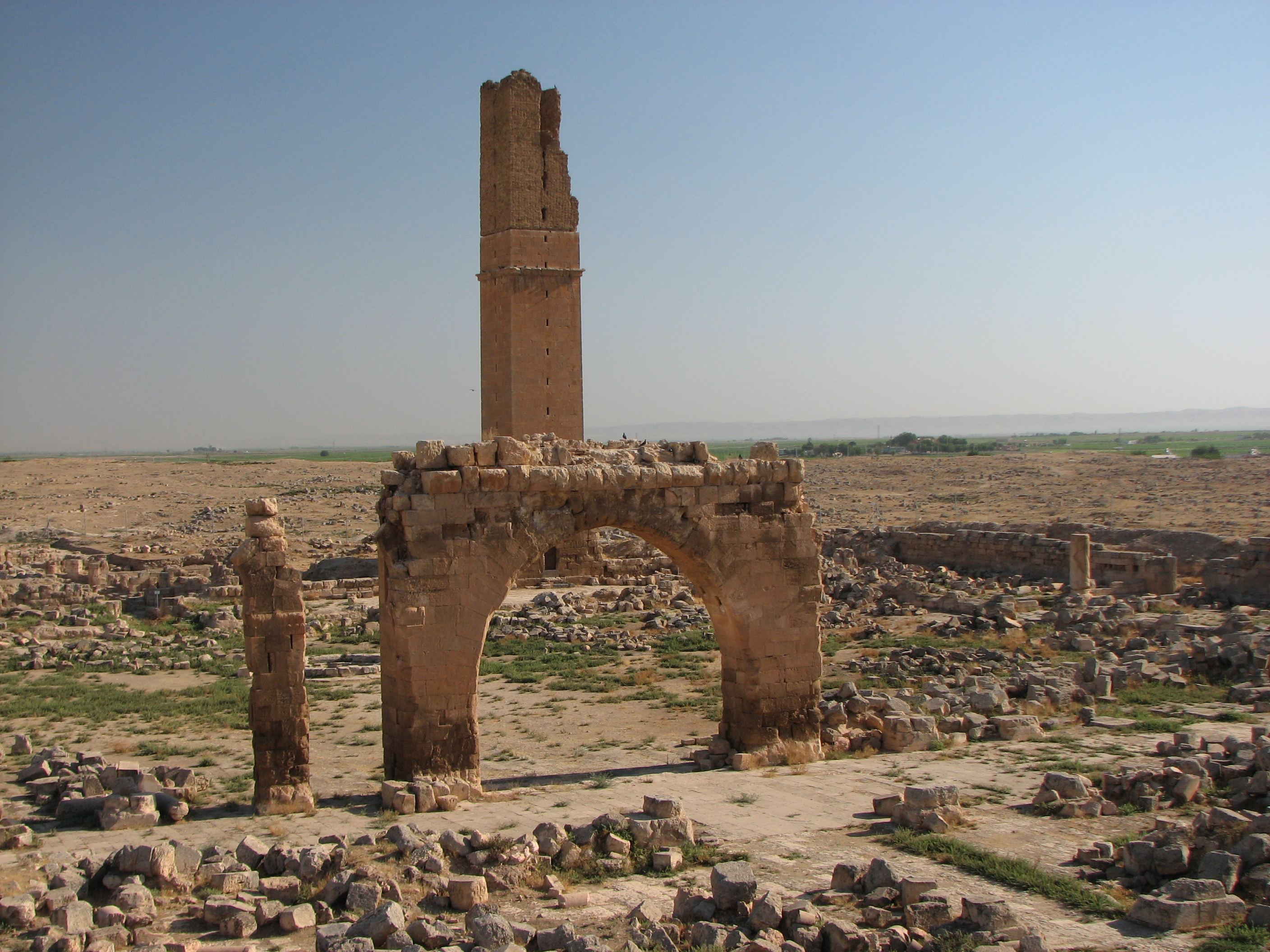
Ruins of the University of Harran

The Fall of Harran refers to the siege and capture of the Assyrian city of Harran by the Median and Neo-Babylonian empires.

== Background ==
From the year 639 BC, the Neo-Assyrian Empire had been suffering from a decline in their power, culminating in Babylonian and Median invasions of their lands. The city of Arrapḫa fell in 615 BC, followed by Assur in 614 BC, and finally the famed Nineveh, the newest capital of Assyria, in 612 BC. Despite the brutal massacres that followed, the Assyrians survived as a political entity and escaped to Harran under their new king, Ashur-uballit II. Establishing Harran as a capital for the Assyrians caught the attention of the Babylonian King Nabopolassar and Median King Cyaxares, who were determined to forever destroy the threat of Assyrian resurgence.

== Siege ==
Assyrian annals record no more events after 610 BC - the presumed date of the siege. The siege lasted for another year before the city finally fell in 609 BC.

== Aftermath ==
With the fall of Harran, the Assyrian empire ceased to exist as a state. Remnants of the former Assyrian empire's army met up with the Egyptian forces that had defeated the Kingdom of Judah at Megiddo but their combined forces were defeated again the same year at the Siege of Harran and in 605 BC at Carchemish, ending the Egyptian intervention in the Near East.
