= Fall of Nineveh =

Battle at the capital of the Neo-Assyrian Empire

- Part of the Medo-Babylonian conquest of the Assyrian Empire
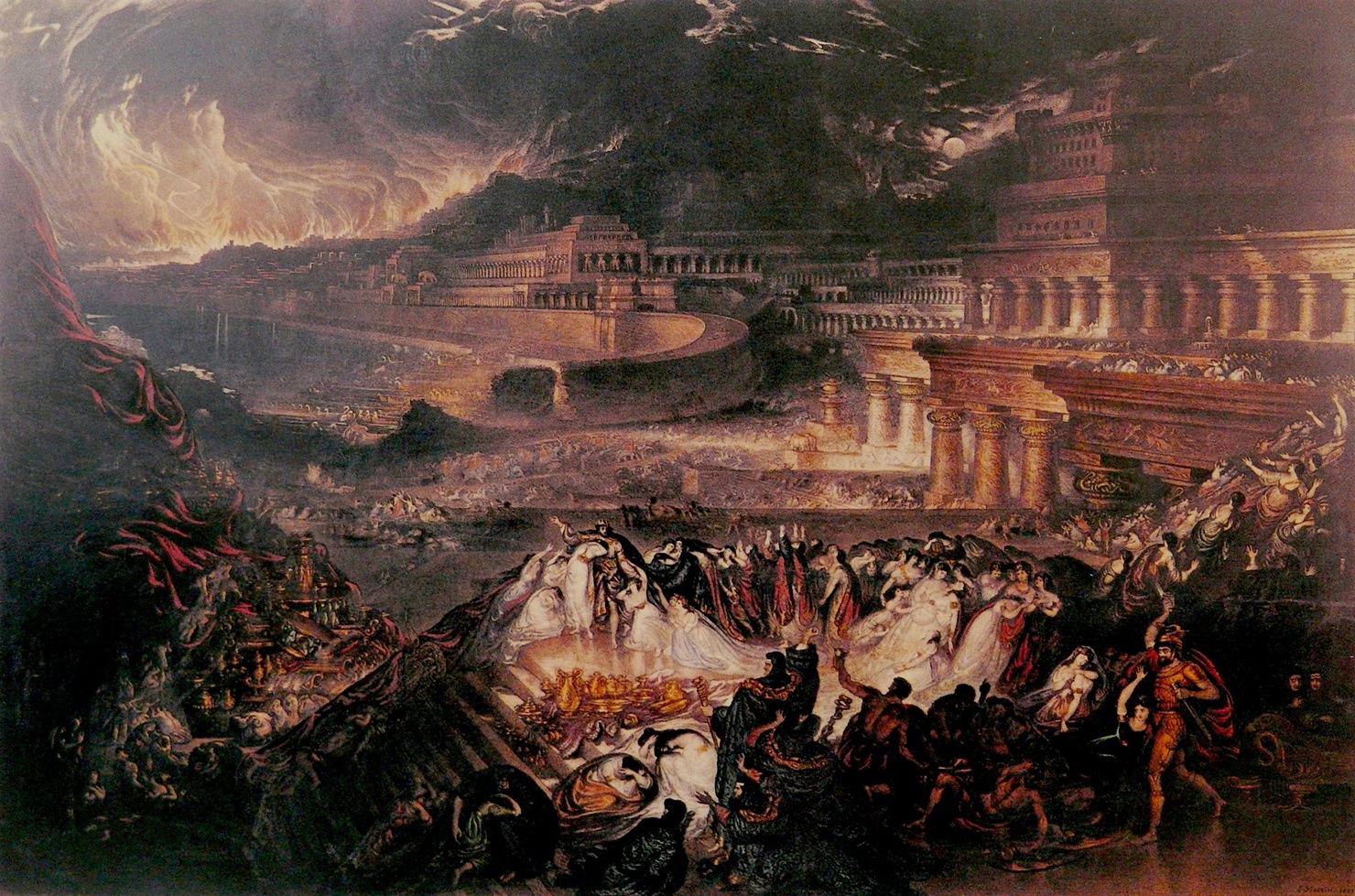
- Painting titled The Fall of Nineveh by John Martin
Date	May–August 10, 612 BCE
Location	Nineveh 36°21′34″N 43°09′10″E
Result	Medo-Babylonian victory

Belligerents
Neo-Babylonian Empire; Median Kingdom	Neo-Assyrian Empire

Commanders and leaders
Nabopolassar; Cyaxares	Sinsharishkun †
- Location within Iraq

The Fall of Nineveh, also called the Battle of Nineveh, was a major battle that marked the climax of the Conquest of the Assyrian Empire in 612 BC. After the Assyrian defeat at the Fall of Assur, an allied army which involved the combined forces of Medes and the Babylonians besieged Nineveh (in modern-day Mosul) and took what was, at that time, one of the greatest cities in the world. The fall of Nineveh led to the destruction of the Neo-Assyrian Empire as the dominant state in the Ancient Near East over the following three years. Archeological records show that the capital of the once-mighty Assyrian Empire was extensively de-urbanized and depopulated in the decades and centuries following the battle. A garbled account of the fall of the city later led to the story of the legendary king Sardanapalus.

Babylon became the imperial center of Mesopotamia for the first time in over a thousand years, leading to the Neo-Babylonian Empire, claiming imperial continuity as a new dynasty.

== Background ==
The Neo-Assyrian Empire emerged in the 10th century BCE and peaked in the 8th and 7th centuries BCE, succeeding the Middle Assyrian Empire (1366–1074 BC) as the largest empire the world had yet seen. By the reign of Ashurbanipal, it controlled or held in vassalage most of the nations and city-states from the Caucasus Mountains (modern Armenia, Georgia and Azerbaijan) in the north to Egypt, Arabia and central Iran/Persia in the east to Cyprus and the Hellenic and Phoenician Mediterranean coasts of Anatolia and the Levant in the west.

However, after the death of King Ashurbanipal in 631 BCE, the once mighty empire was becoming increasingly volatile, with Assyria proper erupting into a series of internal civil wars. This led many of the subject states, many of which had their own political dynasties, to become restive, whereas neighboring states and groups, such as the Medes, Babylonians, and Chaldean became increasingly hostile under the Assyrian hegemony.

The Assyrians had, by the accounts of their own records, been brutal rulers even by the standards of the time, and thus had accumulated many hitherto impotent enemies. It had been weakened by a three-front struggle to maintain power in Egypt, wage a costly but victorious war against the Elamites, and put down rebellions among their southern Mesopotamian Babylonian kinsmen, even though the core of the empire had been largely at peace. The Assyrian monarchs wrote constantly of internal danger and fear of palace intrigue and rebellion.

Upon the death of Ashurbanipal, a series of bitter and bloody wars of succession occurred, weakening the empire – from 625 BC onward, the empire's domination over the Middle East, Asia Minor, Caucasus and Eastern Mediterranean gradually began to fade.

An alliance was formed between external states, such as the Chaldeans, who took advantage of the upheavals in Assyria to take control of much of Babylonia with the aid of the Babylonians themselves. This precipitated the Neo-Babylonian Empire, whose goal was to overthrow the Neo-Assyrian Empire, seize the capital Nineveh, and transfer the seat of Mesopotamian power to Babylon.

Nineveh was not only a political capital, but home to one of the great libraries of Akkadian tablets and a recipient of tribute from across the near east, making it a valuable location to sack. The Assyrian chronicles end abruptly in 639 BC after the destruction of Susa, the capital of Elam, and the subjugation of a rebellious Babylon ruled by Ashurbanipal's own brother Shamash-shum-ukin. Business records are missing after 631 BC.

The Medes were ruled by King Cyaxares. Although initially defeated by the Assyrians, he rebuilt his army and attacked Nineveh in conjunction with other warring factions.

The primary sources are written afterwards, by a victorious Neo-Babylonian from the reign of Nabopolassar (The primary chronicle is numbered 21901, which was translated by C. J. Gadd in 1923, and can be found in the British Museum), by the Babylonian tradition set down by Herodotus much later, by a Hebrew tradition attributed to Nahum, and by references in Egyptian chronicles, all of which were hostile to Assyria. There are also legends that have grown up in the centuries afterwards, among peoples who descend from one of the involved nationalities, including the still Mesopotamian Eastern Aramaic speaking and Christian Assyrians of northern Iraq, southeast Turkey, northwest Iran and northeast Syria.

== Account of the battle ==
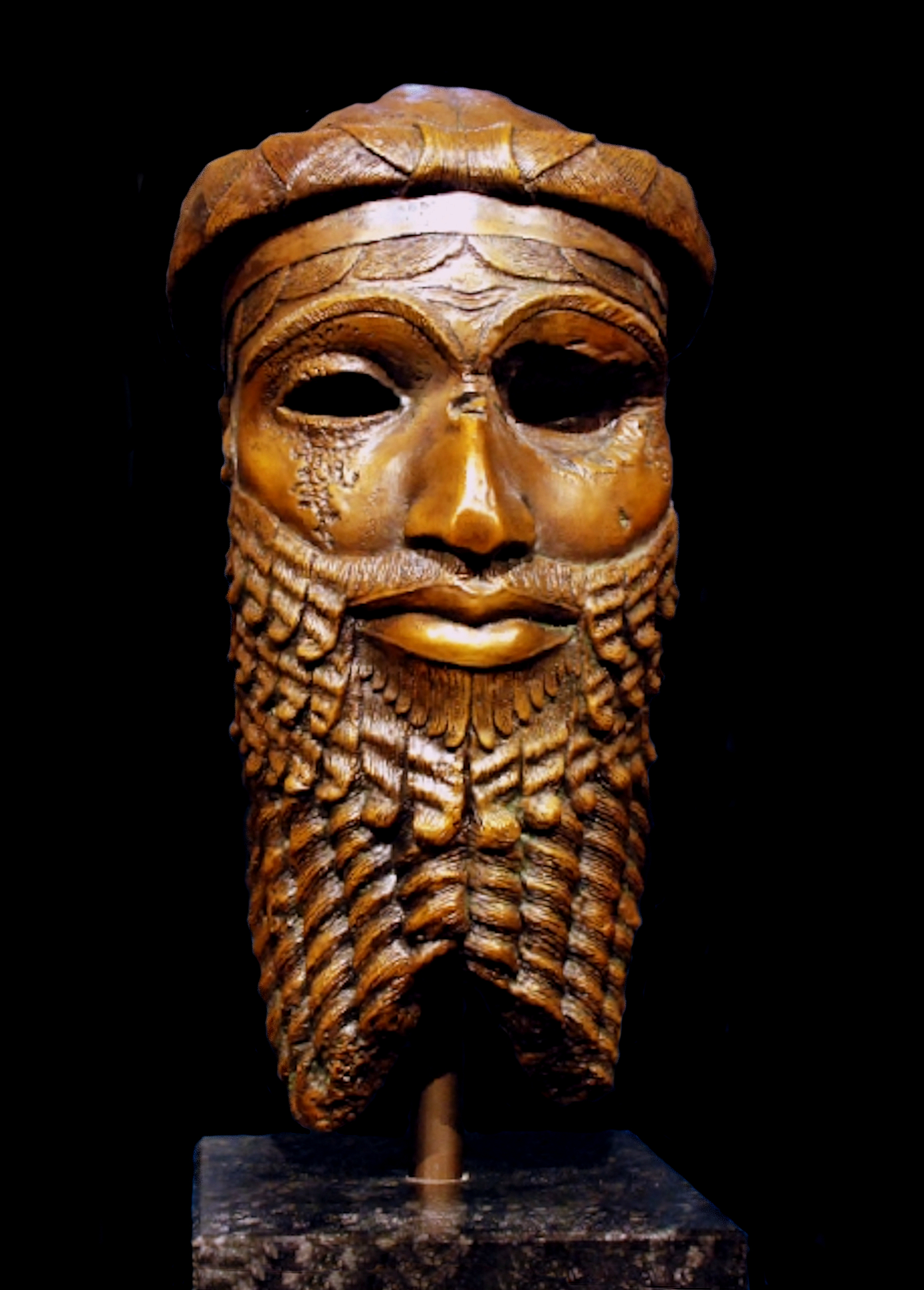
The "Mask of Sargon of Akkad" (dated circa 2250 BC) was found in 1931 in Nineveh: it was probably mutilated during the destruction of Nineveh by the Medes and Babylonians in 612 BC.

One of the recountings of the actual battle is taken from the excerpts of Persica, written by Ctesias, preserved in Diodorus Siculus and Photius, whose account may have been mixed with accounts of other battles.

According to a Babylonian clay tablet discovered in the 19th century named the Fall of Nineveh Chronicle, there was a bitter 12-year struggle between Babylon and Assyria, as well as civil wars in Assyria itself. They describe that in the tenth year of Nabopolassar (616 BC) the Babylonians defeated the Assyrian army and marched up the river, sacking Mane, Sahiri and Baliḫu.

The conflict was renewed the next year, with the Assyrians mustering their army and driving the Babylonians back to Takritain. Nabopolassar stationed his army in the fortress of Takritain, and the two armies fought there the next year. The Assyrians were beaten and retreated to Assyria.

The Babylonians then allied with the Medes and Scythians. The Median army took Tarbiṣu, near Nineveh, and encamped nearby; they then attacked the city of Assur, with the Babylonian text recounting how in 614 BC their Median ally destroyed Assur's temples and sacked the city, but their army did not reach the city until after the plundering had been done.

In 612 BC, the Babylonians mustered their army again and joined with Median king Cyaxares encamping against Nineveh. In May, they laid siege to the city for three months and, in August, finally broke through the defenses and began plundering and burning the city. The major factor in the city’s downfall was the Medes. The Assyrian King Sin-shar-ishkun was killed in the siege. His brother Ashur-uballit II was made King of Assyria. He refused to submit, however, and successfully fought his way out of Nineveh, founding a final capital at Harran. The fighting and the looting of the city continued until August 10, after which the invading forces withdrew.

According to tradition laid out in Diodorus, the Tigris river flooded the city. While his account is often suspect, this aspect has been given attention. The allied armies entered the area of the outer wall and fought to enter the palace. According to one theory, the invading forces diverted the Khosr River, a tributary of the Tigris, generating a flood that allowed them to breach Nineveh's walls. Temples were looted and the palace was burned, though this did not destroy the city, and may have aided the preservation of clay texts.

== Aftermath ==
There would be several more campaigns against Assyria by the Neo-Babylonians and their allies, including one against an allied Egyptian-Assyrian army. Thus, while the Fall of Nineveh was a turning point in the war, Ashur-uballit II would fight on for several more years. His ultimate fate is not known or recorded — he may have been killed at the Fall of Harran in 609 BC (which ended the Assyrian Empire) or at Carchemish in 605 BC (where Egypt and remnants of the army of the former Assyrian Empire were defeated); or he may have simply disappeared into obscurity.

== See also ==
- Battle of Nineveh (627 CE)
- Fall of Babylon
- Book of Nahum
- Sack of Thebes
- Siege of Baghdad

== Bibliography ==
- Dandamayev, M.; Grantovskiĭ, È. (1987). "ASSYRIA i. The Kingdom of Assyria and its Relations with Iran". Encyclopaedia Iranica, Vol. II, Fasc. 8. pp. 806–815.
- Dandamayev, M.; Medvedskaya, I. (2006). "MEDIA". Encyclopaedia Iranica.
- Frahm, Eckart (12 June 2017). A Companion to Assyria. John Wiley & Sons. ISBN 978-1-4443-3593-4.
- Lipschits, Oded (2005). The Fall and Rise of Jerusalem: Judah Under Babylonian Rule. Eisenbrauns. ISBN 978-1-57506-095-8.
