= Zahiran =

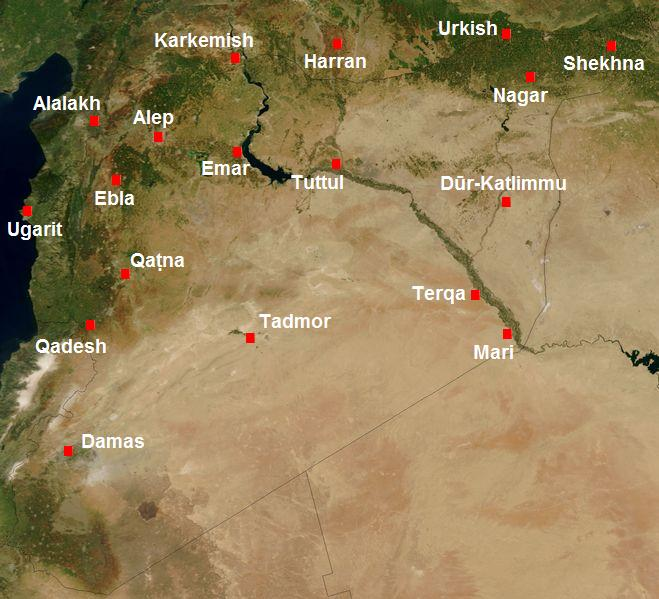
Ancient Syria

Zahiran also known as Sahiri or Sa-hi-ri, also known as Zahiran was an Iron Age city of the ancient Near East. It was a city in what is today Syria.

== History ==
=== Early Bronze Age ===
==== Zahiran ====
During the Mari–Ebla war (2300 BC) Zahiran was the site of a battle between Igrish-Halam King of Ebla, and Iblul-il, King of Mari. About a decade later, it would be absorbed into the empire of Sargon of Akkad.

=== Iron Age ===
==== Assyrian period ====
The town was sacked in the Battle of Nineveh (612 BC). The chronicle of Aššur-uballit II, known as Chronicle 3, states of the Battle of Nineveh between Babylonian and Assyrian armies that "in the month Âbu the king of Akkad and his army went upstream to Mane, Sahiri and Bali-hu. He plundered them, sacked them extensively, and abducted their gods."
