= Mane (ancient city) =

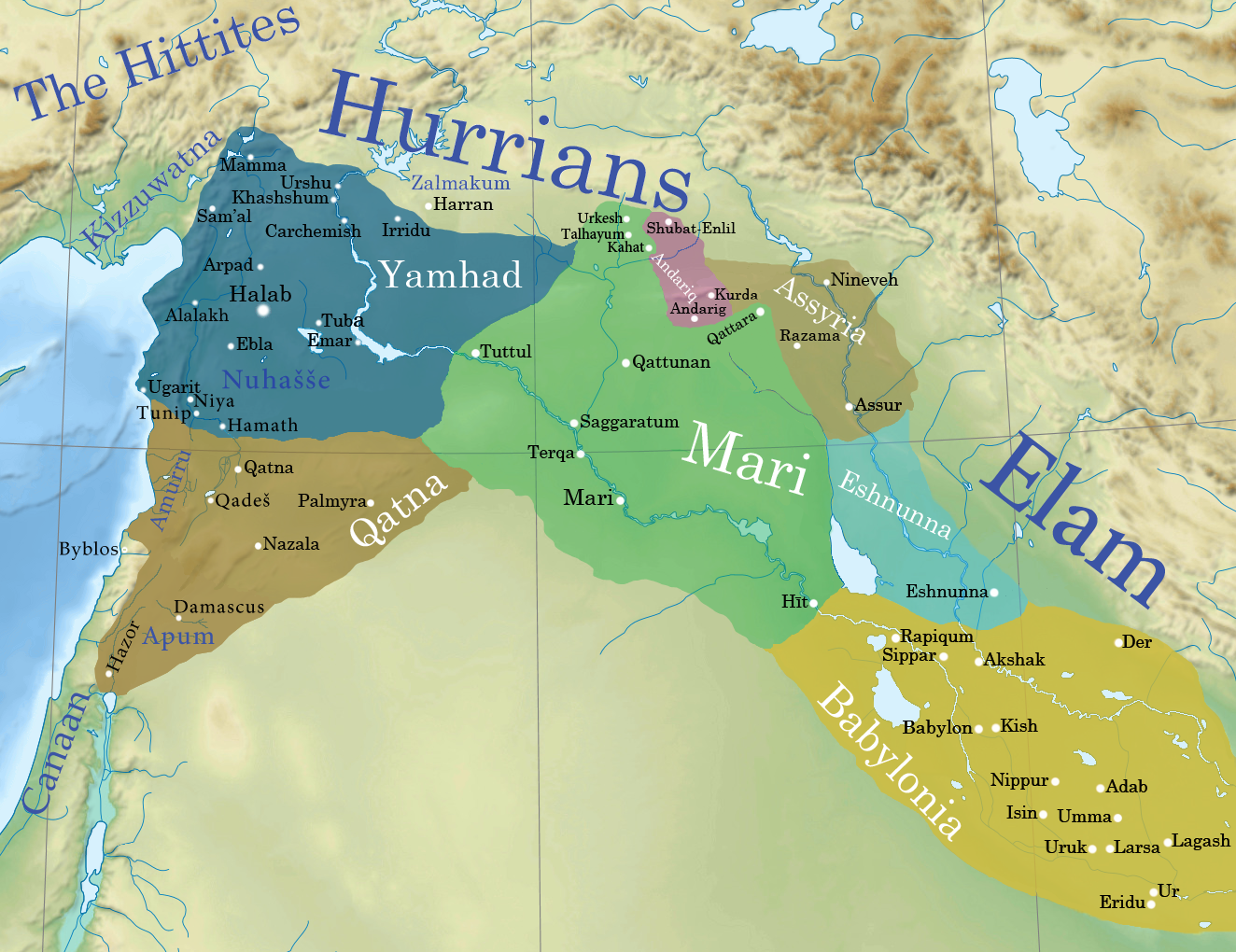
Ancient Syria

Mane was an ancient city in what is today Syria and northern Iraq. Its exact location remains unknown, though it was north of Nineveh. During the Battle of Nineveh (612 BC), it was besieged. The chronicle of Aššur-uballit II, known as Chronicle 3, states of the Battle of Nineveh between Babylonian and Assyrian armies that

"in the month Âbu the king of Akkad and his army went upstream to Mane, Sahiri and Bali-hu. He plundered them, sacked them extensively and abducted their gods."
