= Fall of Assur =

614 BC battle

- Part of the Median conquest of Assyria
Date	614 BC
Location	Assyria
Result	Median victory

Belligerents
Median Kingdom	Assyrian Empire

Commanders and leaders
Cyaxares	Sinsharishkun

The fall of Assur, occurred when the first city and old capital of the Neo-Assyrian Empire fell to Median, Babylonian, and other rebellion-led forces. The sack of the city that followed destroyed the city to some degree; however, it recovered during the Achaemenid Empire. The city remained occupied by Assyrians until the massacres of Tamurlane in the 14th century AD.

== Background ==
Ever since the end of Ashurbanipal's reign in 631 BC, the Neo-Assyrian Empire was in an exposed and critical position; civil war, revolts in Babylonia, Anatolia, Caucasus and in the Levant coupled with Median, Babylonian and Scythian invasions proved too much for the empire torn by civil war. In 616 BC, the Babylonians established their de facto independence from the Assyrians.

== Assault on the city ==
In 615 BC, the Medes and their allies conquered Arrapḫa. The next year, they besieged Assur. Much of what was left of the Assyrian army was in Nineveh, unable to assist. Finally, after bloody hand-to-hand clashes (many skulls and skeletons were later found), the city was taken in 614 BC.

== See also ==
- Fall of Nineveh
- Fall of Harran
