= Tarbiṣu =

Archaeological site in Iraq

- Sherif Khan
- Location within Iraq
- 36°24′54″N 43°07′11″E
- Type: settlement
- Periods: Bronze Age, Iron Age
- Location: Ninawa Governorate, Iraq

History
- Built: 2rd millennium BC

Site notes
- Excavation dates: 1850, 1852
- Archaeologists: Austen Henry Layard, Sir Henry Rawlinson
- Condition: Ruined
- Owner: Public
- Public access: Yes

Tarbiṣu (modern Sherif Khan, Ninawa Governorate, Iraq) was an ancient city about 3 miles north of Nineveh.

== History ==
The first mention of location was in a chronicle of Middle Assyrian ruler Arik-den-ili (c. 1317–1306 BC). Tarbiṣu was a minor town which was under the control of Assyria early in the 1st Millennium BC with an early inscription found there dating to the rule of Shalmaneser III (859–824 BC). It grew in size and importance after the capital of the Neo-Assyrian Empire was moved to nearby Nineveh by Sennacherib. Two palaces were built there, one by Esarhaddon for his son and crown prince, Ashurbanipal. Two temples were found at the site, one being the temple of Nergal, constructed by Sennacherib, and added to by Ashurbanipal. One of the gates in the northwest wall of Nineveh was named for Nergal and the road from that gate to Tarbiṣu was paved completely in stone by Sennacherib.

Tarbiṣu was captured by the Medes in 614 BC, led by Cyaxares in the 12th year of Nabopolassar, king of Babylon and faded along with the Assyrian Empire.

== Archaeology ==
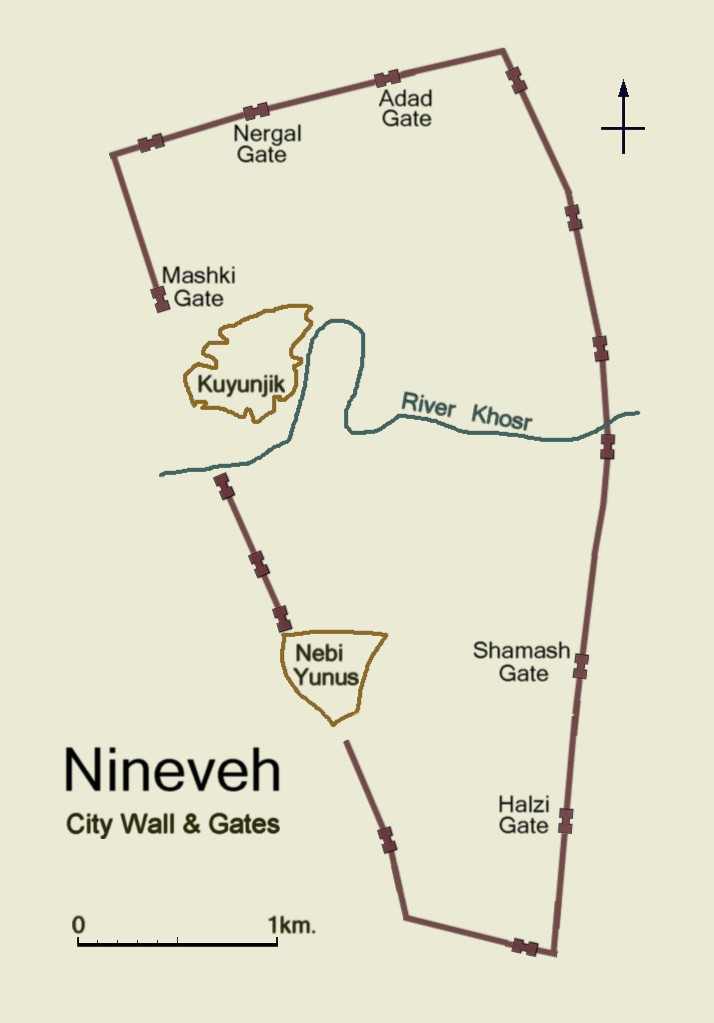
Wall and Gates of Nineveh

Tarbiṣu was excavated by Austen Henry Layard in 1850, and then Sir Henry Rawlinson under the auspices of the British Museum in 1852. Among the small finds were "royal cylinder in red carnelian," which had been wrapped in gold leaf, presumably kept as a relic. In 1968 the University of Mosul was granted a license to excavate at the site.

== See also ==
- Cities of the ancient Near East
- Short chronology timeline
