= Battle of Arrapḫa =

615 BCE battle

The Battle of Arrapḫa took place in 616 BC during the Medo-Babylonian conquest of the Assyrian Empire. Babylonian king Nabopolassar with the help of other rebellion forces succeeded by driving the Assyrians back to the Little Zab, near Arrapḫa - in doing so capturing many Assyrian armoury, horses, and chariots. The next year, Cyaxares, king of the Medes went to battle the Assyrians and conquered the region around Arrapḫa in preparation for a great campaign against the Assyrians.
