= Harran Census =

Group of clay tablets from Iron Age Syria

The Haran Census is a group of clay tablets from Iron Age Syria, listing rural estates and their dependent peoples dated to the reign of Sargon II. Found in Nineveh, the census actually describes the area around Harran. The census shows that the population in the estates and nearby cities was predominantly Western Semitic, and had an average density of 5 persons per household. The census also provides the name of many smaller towns and the main residents of the time, and provides evidence that the Harran region was growing wheat, barley as well as vines, at the time.
