= Revolt of Babylon (626 BC) =

626 BC battle

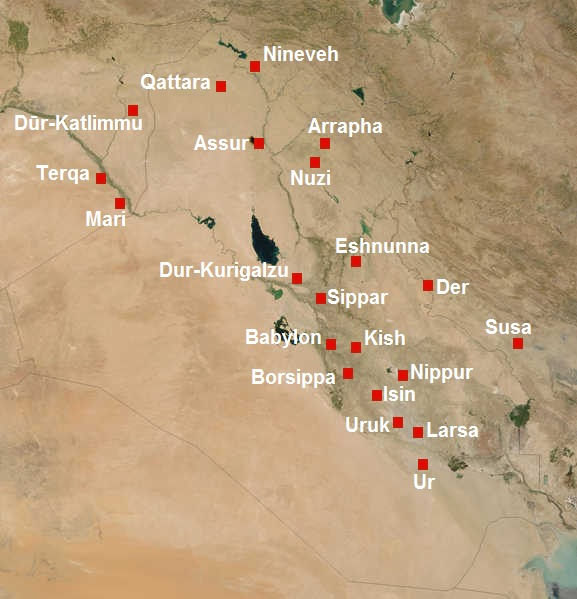
- Map of some major Mesopotamian cities. The cities of Babylon, Nippur, Sippar and Uruk were sites for several battles during the revolt.
Date	626–620 BC
Location	Babylon and surrounding lands
Result	Babylonians victory; Assyria permanently loses control of Babylonia; Formation of the Neo-Babylonian Empire; Beginning of the Medo-Babylonian conquest of the Assyrian Empire

Belligerents
Babylonians	Neo-Assyrian Empire

Commanders and leaders
Nabopolassar	Sinsharishkun

Strength
Unknown	Unknown

Casualties and losses
Unknown	Unknown

The Revolt of Babylon in 626 BC refers to the revolt of the general Nabopolassar and his war of independence until he successfully consolidated control of Babylonia in 620 BC, defeating the Neo-Assyrian Empire which had ruled Babylonia for more than a century. The revolt saw the formation of the Neo-Babylonian Empire and was one of the key factors contributing to the fall of Assyria; twenty years after the revolt had begun, Nabopolassar's army and that of his ally, Cyaxares of the Medes, had destroyed the Neo-Assyrian Empire.

== Background ==
Since the Neo-Assyrian Empire had conquered Babylon in 729 BC under King Tiglath-Pileser III, the Assyrian kings had been plagued by the "Babylonian problem"; regular rebellions in the south aimed at restoring independence. Despite many attempts by the Assyrian kings to resolve this issue, such as Sennacherib's destruction of Babylon and Esarhaddon's restoration of it, rebellions and insurrections remained common. The revolt of 626 BC was only the last in a long line of Babylonian uprisings against the Assyrians.

== Revolt ==
In 626 BC, early in the reign of the Assyrian king Sinsharishkun, a general called Nabopolassar used the political instability caused by an earlier brief civil war between the king and the general Sin-shumu-lishir to assault the cities of Babylon and Nippur. Nabopolassar was victorious in both battles, but the response from the Assyrians was quick and by October 626 BC the Assyrians had recaptured Nippur and besieged Nabopolassar at the city of Uruk. The Assyrian army failed to capture Babylon and Nabopolassar's garrison at Uruk also successfully repulsed them.

On November 22/23 626 BC, Nabopolassar was formally crowned as King of Babylon, the Assyrians having failed to capture and kill him, which restored Babylonia as an independent kingdom after more than a century of Assyrian rule. Sinsharishkun's forces campaigned in northern Babylonia 625–623 BC and though initially successful (taking the city Sippar and defeating Nabopolassar's attempted reconquest of Nippur), other southern cities, such as Der, began to rise up against the Assyrians at around this time. Sinsharishkun realized the threat a large-scale revolt posed and led a massive counterattack in person, successfully recapturing Uruk, one of Nabopolassar's main seats of power, in 623 BC.

Nabopolassar may have ultimately been defeated and control of Babylonia might have been restored had it not been for a 622 BC revolt led by an Assyrian general (whose name remains unknown) in the empire's western provinces. Taking advantage of Sinsharishkun's and the Assyrian army's absence in Babylonia, this general marched on the Assyrian capital of Nineveh where he successfully seized the Assyrian throne. This development forced Sinsharishkun to abandon his Babylonian campaign and though he successfully defeated the usurper in just a hundred days, his absence allowed the Babylonians to conquer the last remaining Assyrian outposts in Babylonia from 622 BC to 620 BC. Both Uruk and Nippur, the cities who had shifted the most between Assyrian and Babylonian control were firmly in Babylonian hands by 620 BC and Nabopolassar had consolidated his rule over all of Babylonia.

== Aftermath ==
After having restored Babylonia as an independent kingdom under himself, Nabopolassar continued to wage war against the Assyrians. By 616 BC he had reached as far north as the Balikh River. The Egyptians wanted to keep Assyria alive, as a kind of buffer state between them and the Medes and Babylonians, thus, Pharaoh Psamtik I of Egypt joined the conflict. In June 615 BC, Nabopolassar failed to conquer Assur, but in October or November 615 BC, the Medes, another ancient enemy of Assyria, under King Cyaxares entered Assyria and conquered the region around the city of Arrapḫa in preparation for a great final campaign against Sinsharishkun. In July or August of 614 BC, the Medes mounted attacks on the cities of Kalhu and Nineveh and successfully conquered Tarbiṣu and Assur, the ceremonial and religious center of Assyria, plundering it and killing many of its inhabitants. Nabopolassar only arrived at Assur after the plunder had already begun and met with Cyaxares, allying with him and signing an anti-Assyrian pact. Shortly after Assur's fall, Sinsharishkun made his last attempt at a counterattack, rushing to rescue the besieged city of Rahilu, but Nabopolassar's army had retreated before a battle could take place.

In April or May 612 BC, at the start of Nabopolassar's fourteenth year as King of Babylon, the combined Medo-Babylonian army marched on Nineveh. From June to August of that year, they besieged the Assyrian capital and in August the walls were breached, leading to a lengthy and brutal sack. In 609 BC, the Medo-Babylonian forces decisively defeated the last Assyrian king, Ashur-uballit II, ending the Neo-Assyrian Empire.
