= Siege of Harran =

Failed military blockade in Mediaeval Mesopotamia

- Part of Egyptian–Babylonian wars
Date	609 BC
Location	Harran (modern-day Şanlıurfa, Turkey)
Result	Unsuccessful siege Medo-Babylonian victory

Belligerents
Egypt; Remnants of the army of the former Assyria	Medes; Babylonians

Commanders and leaders
Ashur-uballit II; Necho II	Cyaxares (Mede); Nabopolassar (Babylonian)

Casualties and losses
Unknown	Unknown

After the death of Assurbanipal in 631 BC, the Neo-Assyrian Empire entered a period of instability. This was the moment when the Babylonian ruler, Nabopolassar, led a revolt against Assyrian rule. After a few years of war, the Babylonians expelled the Assyrian forces from their territory.

The situation became highly dangerous for Assyria with the offensive of Cyaxares, king of the Medes, in 616 BC. The Median forces swiftly conquered Tarbiṣu and decisively defeated the Assyrian army at the Battle of Assur. Then, they joined the Babylonian army and launched a combined offensive against Nineveh in 612 BC.

After the Battle of Nineveh, where the Assyrian king Sin-Shar-Ishkun died, Ashur-uballit II became king and went to Harran with his remaining troops. But the Medes and the Babylonians besieged Harran and took the city, forcing Assur-Uballit II to flee to the Egyptian city of Carchemish with the remnants of his army. After Harran fell, Egyptians and the remnants of the Assyrian forces left Carchemish and attacked the Medes and the Babylonians garrisoned in Harran. However, this offensive failed.
