= Ashur-uballit II =

- Ruling crown prince of Assyria

Ruler of the Neo-Assyrian Empire
- Reign: 612–609 BC
- Predecessor: Sîn-šar-iškun
- Successor: Babylonian conquest
- Born: c. 645 BC (Note: As per Reade (1998), discussing the crown prince in 626 BC as "probably then in his twenties".)
- Died: c. 608–606 BC (aged c. 40)
- Akkadian: Aššur-uballiṭ
- Dynasty: Sargonid dynasty
- Father: Sîn-šar-iškun (?)

Aššur-uballiṭ II, also spelled Assur-uballit II and Ashuruballit II (Neo-Assyrian Akkadian: 𒀸𒋩𒌑𒋾𒆷, romanized: Aššur-uballiṭ, meaning "Ashur has kept alive"), was the final ruler of Assyria, ruling from his predecessor Sîn-šar-iškun's death at the Fall of Nineveh in 612 BC to his own defeat at Harran in 609 BC and failure to retake the city in 608 BC. He was possibly the son of Sîn-šar-iškun and likely the same person as a crown prince mentioned in inscriptions at the Assyrian capital of Nineveh in 626 and 623 BC.

Over the course of Sîn-šar-iškun's reign, the Neo-Assyrian Empire had been irreversibly weakened by war between rival claimants to the throne. A revolt in 626–620 BC in Babylonia had seen the loss of the empire's southern provinces which would go on to form the Neo-Babylonian Empire, war against its king Nabopolassar and the Medes and attacks on its northern territories by Scythians proved disastrous for Assyria; leading to sacks and destructions of the important cities of Assur, Kalhu, Arbela, Arrapḫa and Nineveh between 614 BC and 612 BC.

After the loss of these cities and the death of Sîn-šar-iškun, Aššur-uballiṭ II rallied what remained of the Assyrian army at Harran where, bolstered by an alliance with Egypt (former vassals of Assyria), he ruled for three years, and may have continued to fight on after the loss of all Assyrian cities. His identification as "king of Assyria" comes from Babylonian sources. Contemporary Assyrian inscriptions suggest that the Assyrians saw Aššur-uballiṭ as their legitimate ruler, but continued to refer to him as "crown prince" seeing as he could not undergo the traditional Assyrian coronation ceremony at Assur and thus had not formally been bestowed with the kingship by the Assyrian chief deity, Ashur. His rule at Harran came to an end when the city was seized by Medo-Babylonian forces in 610 BC. Aššur-uballiṭ's attempt at retaking it in 609 BC was repulsed whereafter he is no longer mentioned in contemporary chronicles, signalling the end of the ancient Assyrian monarchy.

== Background ==
In the beginning of the 7th century BC, Assyria was at the height of its power. The entire Fertile Crescent, Levant, large swathes of Ancient Iran and eastern Anatolia, parts of the southern Caucasus, East Mediterranean as far as Cyprus, northern Arabian Peninsula and for a time Egypt and eastern Libya was under the rule of the Assyrian king and due to the flourishing of trade and culture, the era has been described as the Pax Assyriaca (a term coined to parallel the Pax Romana). By the end of the same century, the Assyrian empire had fallen, and although Assyria remained as a satrapy and geopolitical entity until the mid 7th century AD and a number of Neo-Assyrian polities arose between the mid 2nd century BC and mid 3rd century AD, Assyrian power was never to rise again.

One of the major reasons for its fall was Assyria's failure to efficiently solve the so-called "Babylonian problem", the near constant rebellions in its southern provinces, especially in the ancient and prestigious city of Babylon. Although some kings had ruled successfully without revolts in Babylonia, such as Esarhaddon, the revolts in the region had intensified during the rule of Sîn-šar-iškun (reigned 627–612 BC). Sîn-šar-iškun had come to the throne in 627 BC following the death of his brother Aššur-etil-ilāni and was almost immediately faced by a revolt by the Assyrian general Sîn-šumu-līšir in 626 BC, who successfully seized some cities in northern Babylonia, including Babylon itself and Nippur. Although Sîn-šumu-līšir was defeated after only three months, his revolt weakened Assyrian control in Babylonia.

Almost immediately afterwards, another revolt sprung up in Babylonia, this one by Nabopolassar, who successfully seized both Babylon and Nippur. The defeat of Sîn-šar-iškun's attempted reconquest of these cities in October of 626 BC was the final Assyrian campaign for the city of Babylon. On 22/23 November of that year, Nabopolassar was formally crowned as king of Babylon, founding the Neo-Babylonian Empire. Sîn-šar-iškun attempted to reconquer cities in northern Babylonia in 625–624 BC but was repeatedly repelled. In 622 BC, Nabopolassar seized the last Assyrian outposts in Babylonia but was initially unable to encroach into Assyria itself.

The Babylonians scored repeated victories against the weakened Assyrians and by 616 BC Babylonian troops had even reached as far north as the Balikh River. Assyria's ally, Pharaoh Psamtik I of Egypt, whose dynasty had been installed as vassals of Assyria following the Assyrian destruction of the Kushite Empire saw Assyria as a buffer between his own kingdom and those of the Babylonians and Medes in the east, rushed to Sîn-šar-iškun's aid, but a joint Egyptian-Assyrian campaign into Babylonia was unsuccessful. In 614 BC, the city of Assur, once the capital and still the ideological and religious center of Assyria, was captured, plundered and sacked by the Medes (hitherto vassals of Assyria) under Cyaxares, allies of Nabopolassar. The Babylonian army under Nabopolassar had been late to the battle, only arriving after the Medes had already killed many of the city's inhabitants and begun plundering it. Two years later, the Assyrian capital itself, Nineveh, fell. The fate of Sîn-šar-iškun is not certain, but it is commonly accepted that he died in defense of Nineveh in 612 BC.

Aššur-uballiṭ 's background is uncertain. It is known that he was an Assyrian general and he might have been the son of Sîn-šar-iškun. Aššur-uballiṭ is likely the same person as the unnamed crown prince (designated heir) attested in inscriptions from Nineveh dated to 626 and 623 BC. Sîn-šar-iškun's appointment of a crown prince so early in his reign (having only become king in 627 BC) was likely to avoid the weakening succession problems which had been common in Assyria since the reign of Sennacherib (reigned 705–681 BC).

== Reign ==
=== Rule at Harran and status ===
In Assyrian tradition, the king was appointed to his position by the Assyrian national deity, Ashur, during the New Year festivals in Assur. The last king to be crowned at the temple of Ashur at Assur had been Sîn-šar-iškun and with the city's destruction in 614 BC, the traditional Assyrian coronation ritual was now impossible. The coronation ritual in Assur saw the god Ashur invest the king with royal power, affirming his status as Ashur's earthly representative. Aššur-uballiṭ did have a coronation ceremony in late 612 BC, but instead of conducting it in Assur, it was conducted in the temple of the moon god Sin, another important deity in the empire, at the northern Assyrian city of Harran. At Harran, the Assyrian Empire continued to endure under the rule of Aššur-uballiṭ. His identification as Sîn-šar-iškun's successor and the king of Assyria comes from Babylonian chronicles. The Babylonians thus saw him as the Assyrian king, but the subjects Aššur-uballiṭ governed himself probably did not share this view. Instead, Aššur-uballiṭ's formal title was crown prince (mar šarri, literally meaning "son of the king"), which can be inferred from preserved documents, such as the following portion of a legal document from the city Dur-Katlimmu:

Whoever contests the agreement, [missing portion] shall be his legal adversaries; the covenant of the crown prince shall seek vengeance; he shall give ten minas of silver.
28th day, month Tebetu, eponym year of Seʾ-ilaʾi. Witness is the city lord Iadiʾ-il. Witness is Nabû-naṣir son of Šulmu-šarri. Witness is Šarru-emuranni son of Nabû-eṭir. Witness is Salmanu-reḫtu-uṣur.

The portion of the document that is important in regards to Aššur-uballiṭ's status is the mention of the "covenant of the crown prince" (adê ša mar šarri). This phrase is common in legal documents, appearing frequently since the reign of Esarhaddon in 672 BC, but always in the form of "covenant of the king" (adê ša šarri), showing that the office of king was vacant and the crown prince filled that role instead. Inscriptions from this time also record the name of the final Commander-in-Chief of the Assyrian army, Nabû-mar-šarri-uṣur (Note: Nabû-mar-šarri-uṣur's predecessor as Commander-in-Chief, Šamaš-sarru-ibni, had probably died with King Sîn-šar-iškun at Nineveh in 612 BC.), which means "O Nabu, protect the crown prince!". Such names were common in Assyria but usually referred to the king, not the crown prince. Aššur-uballiṭ not formally being king does not indicate that his claim to the throne was challenged, only that he had yet to go through with the traditional ceremony. The appointment of a crown prince required the formal recognition of all subjects and of the gods. Should the king be unable to exercise his duties, the crown prince was a competent substitute, exercising similar legal and political power. Aššur-uballiṭ was the recognized legitimate ruler, and his title was only a provisional arrangement until he could undergo the proper coronation.

The choice of Aššur-uballiṭ as a regnal name was probably a highly conscious one. The meaning of the name, "Ashur has kept alive", suggests that Assyria's chief deity and its empire would be ultimately successful in their battle against their enemies. It also connects him to the earlier Assyrian king of the same name, Aššur-uballiṭ I of the 14th century BC who had founded the Middle Assyrian Empire. Aššur-uballiṭ I had been the first Assyrian ruler to abandon the old religious title of iššiʾak ("governor") in favor of the title šarrum ("king"), signifying his role as an absolute monarch.

In Assyria, each year was assigned an eponym name. The name used for the year noted in the Dur-Katlimmu legal document, "Seʾ-ilaʾi", only appears in this source from a city still under Assyrian control, and demonstrates that it is from after the Assyrian heartlands had fallen to invaders, when eponym names, in the absence of central authority, became local and often confined to single cities. The Šulmu-šarri, whose son is mentioned, also appears in inscriptions dating to the reign of Ashurbanipal a little over a decade prior. Although the document uses traditional Assyrian titles such as Companion (ša qurbūte, literally meaning "he who is close to the king") and cohort commander (rab kiṣri), suggesting that they still carried their traditional importance, the document also calls the local leader Iadiʾ-il by the title of city lord (Akkadian: bēl āli) a title formerly only associated with members of the Assyrian ruling dynasty. A non-dynastic appointed official for the government of a city was usually titled as ḫazannu (usually translated as "mayor") or ša muḫḫi āli (meaning "city oversser") and the use of the title bēl āli indicates that parts of the Assyrian administrative framework were no longer functioning by 609 BC.

=== Fall of Harran and attempted recapture ===
At the time Aššur-uballiṭ became the ruler of Assyria in 612 BC, his main objective would have been to retake the Assyrian heartland, including Assur and Nineveh. Bolstered by the forces of his allies, Egypt (a leading military power in the region) and Mannea, this goal was probably seen as quite possible and his rule at Harran and role as crown prince (and not legitimately crowned king) probably seemed like a mere temporary retreat. Instead, Aššur-uballiṭ's rule at Harran composes the final years of the Assyrian Empire, which at this point had effectively ceased to exist.

In 611 BC, Nabopolassar's army consolidated his rule throughout northern Mesopotamia, going as far as to the border of Harran itself. After Nabopolassar himself had travelled the recently conquered Assyrian heartland in 610 BC in order to ensure stability, the Medo-Babylonian army embarked on a campaign against Harran in November of 610 BC. Intimidated by the approach of the Medo-Babylonian army, Aššur-uballiṭ and a contingent of Egyptian reinforcements retreated from the city into the deserts of Syria. The siege of Harran lasted from the winter of 610 BC to the beginning of 609 BC and the city eventually capitulated. Aššur-uballiṭ's failure at Harran marks the end for the ancient Assyrian monarchy, which would never be restored.

After the Babylonians had ruled Harran for three months, Aššur-uballiṭ and a large force of Egyptian soldiers attempted to retake the city, but this campaign failed disastrously. Beginning in July or June 609 BC, Aššur-uballiṭ's siege lasted for two months, until August or September, but he and the Egyptians retreated when Nabopolassar again led his army against them. It is possible that they had retreated even earlier.

== Fate ==
The eventual fate of Aššur-uballiṭ is unknown and his siege of Harran in 609 BC is the last time he, or the Assyrian military in general, are mentioned in Babylonian records. After the battle at Harran, Nabopolassar resumed his campaign against the remainder of the Assyrian army in the beginning of the year 608 or 607 BC. It is thought that Aššur-uballiṭ was still alive at this point, for in 608 BC the Egyptian Pharaoh Necho II, Psamtik I's successor, personally led a large Egyptian army into former Assyrian territory to rescue his ally and turn the tide of the war. Because there is no mention of a large battle between the Egyptians, Assyrians, Babylonians and Medes in 608 BC (a battle between the four greatest military powers of their day is unlikely to have been forgotten and left out of contemporary sources) and no later mentions of Aššur-uballiṭ, it is possible that he died at some point in 608 BC before his allies and his enemies could clash in battle. M.B. Rowton speculates that Aššur-uballiṭ could have lived until 606 BC, but by then the Egyptian army is mentioned in Babylonian sources without any references to the Assyrian king.

Although Aššur-uballiṭ is no longer mentioned after 609 BC, the Egyptian campaigns in the Levant continued for some time until a crushing defeat at Battle of Carchemish in 605 BC which may have involved remnants of the Assyrian army. Throughout the next century, Egypt and Babylon, brought into direct contact with each other through Assyria's fall, would frequently be at war with each other over control in the Fertile Crescent.

== See also ==
- Sargonid dynasty
- List of Assyrian kings
- Military history of the Neo-Assyrian Empire

== Notes ==
Ashur-uballit II Sargonid dynasty Born: c. 645 BC Died: 608–606 BC
Preceded by Sîn-šar-iškun	Ruler of Assyria; 612 – 609 BC	Fall of Assyria to the Median and Neo-Babylonian Empires
