= Kandalanu =

King of Babylon (vassal of the Neo-Assyrian Empire)
- Reign: 647–627 BC
- Predecessor: Shamash-shum-ukin
- Successor: Sin-shumu-lishir
- Died: 627 BC
- Akkadian: Kandalānu

Kandalanu (Neo-Assyrian Akkadian: 𒃶𒁕𒆷𒉡, romanized: Kandalānu) was a vassal king of Babylon under the Neo-Assyrian kings Ashurbanipal and Ashur-etil-ilani, ruling from his appointment by Ashurbanipal in 647 BC to his own death in 627 BC.

After the failed rebellion by the preceding king of Babylon, Shamash-shum-ukin, against Ashurbanipal, Kandalanu was proclaimed as the new vassal king of Babylon. His background is uncertain; it is possible that he was one of Ashurbanipal's younger brothers, a Babylonian noble who had sided with him in Shamash-shum-ukin's revolt, or a simple-minded or deformed man appointed as king to ensure he did not gain the support of the Babylonians for further actions against Assyrian rule.

A mysterious figure, Kandalanu's reign is poorly attested, with historical evidence from his time as ruler being limited to date formulae and chronological texts. Some historians believe that Kandalanu was the same person as Ashurbanipal, Kandalanu simply being the name used by the king in Babylon, but this idea is considered unlikely by modern researchers.

== Historical background ==
Babylonia had been conquered by the Neo-Assyrian Empire by Tiglath-Pileser III (r. 745–727 BC) less than a century before Kandalanu became its king. For most of the period since this conquest, the Assyrian king had simultaneously reigned as the king of Babylon, though the Babylonians often resented their rule. In an attempt to possibly mitigate the animosity of the Babylonians, Esarhaddon (r. 681–669 BC) upon his death granted the kingships of Assyria and Babylonia to two different sons. The elder son Shamash-shum-ukin was granted Babylonia while the younger Ashurbanipal was to become the King of Assyria.

Though this arrangement of two kings worked for some time, Shamash-shum-ukin was in a subordinate position to Ashurbanipal. Inscriptions suggest that any orders Shamash-shum-ukin gave to his subjects first had to be verified and approved by his brother. Ashurbanipal had a permanent garrison stationed at Borsippa, a city deep inside Shamash-shum-ukin's domain. There are also preserved petitions sent by officials in Babylon directly to Ashurbanipal—had Shamash-shum-ukin been the universally respected sovereign of Babylon, he would probably have been the receiver of such letters. Royal records from Babylonia during the time of peaceful coexistence between Ashurbanipal and Shamash-shum-ukin mention both their names, but contemporary documents from Assyria only mention Ashurbanipal, reinforcing that the two kings were not equal in status.

Shamash-shum-ukin grew resentful and in 652 BC he rebelled, assembling a coalition of Assyria's enemies to aid him in his effort to rid himself of Ashurbanipal's yoke. The revolt was unsuccessful and by 650 BC, most of the cities under Shamash-shum-ukin's control had been besieged, including Babylon itself. Having endured starvation and disease over the course of the siege, Babylon fell in 648 BC and was plundered. The circumstances of Shamash-shum-ukin's death after the siege are unclear; though popular legend has it that he committed suicide by setting himself on fire in his palace, contemporary texts (chiefly Ashurbanipal's own annals) only say that he "met a cruel death" and that the gods "consigned him to a fire and destroyed his life". In addition to suicide though self-immolation or other means, he might have been executed or killed accidentally.

== Reign and role ==
With Shamash-shum-ukin's defeat, Ashurbanipal had once more incorporated the region into the Neo-Assyrian Empire. Instead of assuming the kingship himself, he appointed a new vassal king, Kandalanu. Kandalanu's background is uncertain, he might have been a younger brother of the king or a Babylonian noble who had allied with him in the civil war. His name appears to mean some sort of physical deformity, possibly a clubfoot. Alternatively, he might even have been simple-minded, and because of either deformity of simple-mindedness unlikely to gain support for any action towards Assyria. He might also have been perfectly healthy as the appointment of a deformed or simple-minded king might have been seen as a grave offence by the Babylonians and could thus have instigated more unrest in the region.

The only surviving authentic contemporary records of Kandalanu's reign are date formulae in documents referring to his rule and chronological texts (a chronicle and later king lists). His kingdom he ruled was the same as Shamash-shum-ukin's with the exception of the city of Nippur, which Ashurbanipal converted into a powerful Assyrian fortress. His authority is likely to have been very limited and nothing is known of his actions and activities. He probably lacked any true political and military power, which was instead firmly in the hands of the Assyrians.

== Identification with Ashurbanipal ==
Traditionally, the final year of Ashurbanipal was assumed by historians to have been 627 BC as per an inscription at Harran made by Adad-guppi, the mother of the Neo-Babylonian king Nabonidus nearly a century later. The final contemporary evidence for Ashurbanipal being alive and reigning as king is a contract from the city of Nippur made in 631 BC. To get the attested lengths of the reigns of his successors Ashur-etil-ilani and Sinsharishkun to match, his rule must have ended in 631 BC, the year of his death. If it had ended in 627 BC, the inscriptions of his successors Ashur-etil-ilani and Sinsharishkun in Babylon would have been impossible, as the city was seized by Nabopolassar in 626 BC, and never again fell into Assyrian hands.

A once popular theory to explain the discrepancy between the 42-year reign claimed in the Harran inscription and the more likely 38-year reign, for instance defended by Polish historian Stefan Zawadzki in his book The Fall of Assyria (1988), is that Ashubanipal and Kandalanu were the same person, Kandalanu simply being the name the king used in Babylon. This is considered unlikely for several reasons. No previous Assyrian king is known to have used an alternate name in Babylon. Inscriptions from Babylonia also show a difference in the lengths of the reigns of Ashurbanipal and Kandalanu; Ashurbanipal's reign is counted from his first full year as king (668 BC) and Kandalanu's is counted from his first full year as king (647 BC). All Assyrian kings who personally ruled Babylon used the title "King of Babylon" in their own inscriptions, but it is not used in Ashurbanipal's inscriptions, even those made after 648 BC. Babylonian documents treat them as two different people, with no contemporary Babylonian sources describing Ashurbanipal as king of Babylon.

== Sources ==
- Ahmed, Sami Said (2018). Southern Mesopotamia in the time of Ashurbanipal. Walter de Gruyter GmbH & Co KG. ISBN 978-3-11-103358-7.
- Beaulieu, Paul-Alain (2018). A History of Babylon, 2200 BC - AD 75. Pondicherry: Wiley. ISBN 978-1405188999.
- Brinkman, J. A. (2003) [1991]. "Babylonia in the Shadow of Assyria (747–626 B.C.)". In Boardman, John; Edwards, I. E. S.; Hammond, N. G. L.; Sollberger, E.; Walker, C. B. F. (eds.). The Cambridge Ancient History: III Part 2: The Assyrian and Babylonian Empires and Other States of the Near East, from the Eighth to the Sixth Centuries B.C. (2nd ed.). Cambridge University Press. ISBN 0-521-22717-8.
- Frame, Grant (2007) [1992]. Babylonia 689-627 B.C: A Political History. The Netherlands Institute for the Near East. ISBN 978-90-6258-069-9.
- Johns, C. H. W. (1913). Ancient Babylonia. Cambridge University Press. OCLC 756238531.
- Na’aman, Nadav (1991). "Chronology and History in the Late Assyrian Empire (631—619 B.C.)". Zeitschrift für Assyriologie. 81 (1–2): 243–267. doi:10.1515/zava.1991.81.1-2.243. S2CID 159785150.
- Porter, Barbara N. (1993). Images, Power, and Politics: Figurative Aspects of Esarhaddon's Babylonian Policy. American Philosophical Society. ISBN 978-0-87169-208-5.
- Radner, Karen (2003). "The Trials of Esarhaddon: The Conspiracy of 670 BC". ISIMU: Revista sobre Oriente Próximo y Egipto en la antigüedad. 6. Universidad Autónoma de Madrid: 165–183.
- Reade, J. E. (1970). "The Accession of Sinsharishkun". Journal of Cuneiform Studies. 23 (1): 1–9. doi:10.2307/1359277. JSTOR 1359277. S2CID 159764447.
- Reade, J. E. (1998). "Assyrian eponyms, kings and pretenders, 648-605 BC". Orientalia (NOVA Series). 67 (2): 255–265. JSTOR 43076393.
- Zaia, Shana (2019). "My Brother's Keeper: Assurbanipal versus Šamaš-šuma-ukīn" (PDF). Journal of Ancient Near Eastern History. 6 (1): 19–52. doi:10.1515/janeh-2018-2001. hdl:10138/303983. S2CID 165318561.

Kandalanu Died: 627 BC
Preceded by Shamash-shum-ukin	King of Babylon; 647 – 627 BC	Succeeded by Sin-shumu-lishir
