= Aššur-etil-ilāni =

King of the Neo-Assyrian Empire (r. 631–627 BC)

- King of Assyria; King of the Universe

King of the Neo-Assyrian Empire
- Reign: 631–627 BC
- Predecessor: Ashurbanipal
- Successor: Sîn-šar-iškun
- Died: 627 BC
- Spouse: Ana-Tašmētum-taklāk (?)
- Akkadian: Aššur-etil-ilāni
- Dynasty: Sargonid dynasty
- Father: Ashurbanipal
- Mother: Libbāli-šarrat

Aššur-etil-ilāni, also spelled Ashur-etel-ilani and Ashuretillilani (Neo-Assyrian Akkadian: 𒀸𒋩𒉪𒅅𒀭𒈨𒌍, romanized: Aššur-etil-ilāni, meaning "Ashur is the lord of the gods"), was the king of the Neo-Assyrian Empire from 631 BC to 627 BC. (Note: His reign is often given erroneously as 627–623 BC, under the assumption that Ashurbanipal died in 627 BC and not in 631 BC.) Aššur-etil-ilāni is an obscure figure with a brief reign from which few inscriptions survive. Because of this lack of sources, very little concrete information about the king and his reign can be deduced.

It is possible that Aššur-etil-ilāni was a weak ruler as there are no records of the king ever undertaking a military campaign or going on a hunt, activities previous Assyrian kings would famously do very often; this, in turn, may have helped to entice some of Assyria's vassals, such as the Kingdom of Judah, to break free from Assyrian control and begin to act independently. Aššur-etil-ilāni was succeeded by his brother Sîn-šar-iškun under uncertain, though not necessarily violent, circumstances.

== Background and chronology ==
There is a distinct lack of available sources in regards to the last few years of Ashurbanipal's reign and the reign of Aššur-etil-ilāni. The annals of Ashurbanipal, the primary sources for his reign, go no further than 636 BC. Although Ashurbanipal's final year is often repeated as 627 BC, this follows an inscription at Harran made by the mother of the Neo-Babylonian king Nabonidus nearly a century later. The final contemporary evidence for Ashurbanipal being alive and reigning as king is a contract from the city of Nippur made in 631 BC. To get the attested lengths of the reigns of his successors to match, most scholars agree that Ashurbanipal either died, abdicated or was deposed in 631 BC. Of the three options, a death in 631 BC is the most accepted. If Ashurbanipal's reign would have ended in 627 BC, the inscriptions of his successors Aššur-etil-ilāni and Sîn-šar-iškun in Babylon, covering several years, would have been impossible since the city was seized by the Neo-Babylonian king Nabopolassar in 626 BC to never again fall into Assyrian hands.

Ashurbanipal had named his successor as early as 660 BC, when documents referencing a crown prince were written. He had been the father of at least one son, and probably two, early on in his reign. These early sons were likely Aššur-etil-ilāni and Sîn-šar-iškun. The common assumption that Aššur-etil-ilāni came to the throne at a young age is based on the phrase "my father did not rear me" ("rear" meaning to care for someone until they're fully grown), found in one of his inscriptions. However, the same phrase appears in a prayer by Ashurbanipal and Aššur-etil-ilāni is unlikely to have been very young as he is attested to have had male children during his reign.

== Reign ==
Aššur-etil-ilāni ascended the throne after the death of his father Ashurbanipal in 631 BC. A land grant from Aššur-etil-ilāni to his rab šaqi (a general serving him since he was a young boy) Sîn-šumu-līšir suggests that Ashurbanipal died a natural death. As in many other successions in Assyrian history, Aššur-etil-ilāni's rise to the Assyrian throne was initially met with opposition and unrest. The same land grant to Sîn-šumu-līšir references the actions of an Assyrian official called Nabu-riḫtu-uṣur who with the help of another official, Sîn-šar-ibni, attempted to usurp the Assyrian throne. Sin-shum-lishir probably assisted the king with stopping Nabu-riḫtu-uṣur and Sîn-šar-ibni. As no sources indicate the opposite, the conspiracy appears to have been crushed relatively quickly. Excavations at Nineveh from the time around Ashurbanipal's death show fire damage, indicating that the plot perhaps resulted in some violence and unrest within the capital itself.

The spread of inscriptions by Aššur-etil-ilāni in Babylonia suggest that he exercised the same amount of control in the southern provinces as his father Ashurbanipal had, having a vassal king (Kandalanu) but exercising actual political and military power there himself. His inscriptions are known from all the major cities, including Babylon, Dilbat, Sippar and Nippur. Too few inscriptions of Aššur-etil-ilāni survive to make any certain assumptions about his character. Excavations of his palace at Kalhu, one of the more important cities in the empire and a former capital, may indicate that he was less boastful than his father as it had no reliefs or statues similar to those that his predecessors had used to illustrate their strength and success. The lack of such depictions may partly be because there are no records of Aššur-etil-ilāni ever conducting a military campaign or going on a hunt. His Kalhu palace was quite small with unusually small rooms by Assyrian royal standards. It is possible that some of Assyria's vassals used the reign of what they perceived to be a weak ruler to break free of Assyrian control and even attack Assyrian outposts. In c. 628 BC, Josiah, ostensibly an Assyrian vassal and the king of Judah in the Levant, extended his land so that it reached the coast, capturing the city of Ashdod and settling some of his own people there.

It is frequently assumed, without any supporting evidence, that Aššur-etil-ilāni's brother Sîn-šar-iškun fought with him for the throne. Although the exact circumstances of Aššur-etil-ilāni's death and the rise of his brother Sîn-šar-iškun to the throne are unknown, there is no evidence to suggest that Aššur-etil-ilāni was deposed and/or killed in a coup.

== Titles ==
Very few inscriptions survive from Aššur-etil-ilāni's brief reign. Preserved on bricks of the temple of Nabu at Kalhu, the following titles can be read:

I am Aššur-etil-ilāni, King of the Universe, King of Assyria, son of Ashurbanipal, King of the Universe, King of Assyria, grandson of Esarhaddon, King of the Universe, King of Assyria.

== See also ==
- Sargonid dynasty
- List of Assyrian kings

== Notes ==
Aššur-etil-ilāni Sargonid dynasty Died: 627 BC
Preceded by Ashurbanipal	King of Assyria; 631 – 627 BC	Succeeded by Sîn-šar-iškun
