= Sîn-šar-iškun =

Assyrian king (died 612 BC)

- King of Assyria; King of Babylon; King of the Universe

King of the Neo-Assyrian Empire
- Reign: 627–612 BCE
- Predecessor: Aššur-etil-ilāni
- Successor: Aššur-uballiṭ II (Assyria); Nabopolassar (Babylon)
- Born: Before 660 BCE
- Died: August 612 BCE; Nineveh
- Spouse: Ana-Tašmētum-taklāk (?)
- Issue: Aššur-uballiṭ II (?)
- Akkadian: Sîn-šar-iškun; Sîn-šarru-iškun
- Dynasty: Sargonid dynasty
- Father: Ashurbanipal
- Mother: Libbāli-šarrat

Sîn-šar-iškun (Neo-Assyrian Akkadian: 𒁹𒀭𒌍𒌋𒌋𒃻𒌦, romanized: Sîn-šar-iškun or Sîn-šarru-iškun, meaning "Sîn has established the king") was the penultimate king of the Neo-Assyrian Empire, reigning from the death of his brother and predecessor Aššur-etil-ilāni in 627 BCE to his own death at the Fall of Nineveh in 612 BCE.

Succeeding his brother in uncertain, possibly violent circumstances, Sîn-šar-iškun was immediately faced by the revolt of one of his brother's chief generals, Sîn-šumu-līšir, who attempted to usurp the throne for himself and briefly took over much of Babylonia. Though Sîn-šumu-līšir was defeated relatively quickly, the instability caused by his revolt, combined with an ongoing interregnum in Babylonia in the south (neither Sîn-šar-iškun nor Sîn-šumu-līšir had formally proclaimed themselves as kings of Babylon) might be what made it possible for Nabopolassar, a southerner of unclear origin, to rise up and seize power in Babylonia. Sîn-šar-iškun's inability to defeat Nabopolassar, despite repeated attempts over the course of several years, allowed Nabopolassar to consolidate power and form the Neo-Babylonian Empire, restoring Babylonian independence after more than a century of Assyrian rule and centuries of domination prior to that.

The Neo-Babylonian Empire, and the Median ruler Cyaxares, technically still a vassal of Assyria, then invaded the Assyrian heartland. In 614 BCE, the Medes captured and sacked Assur, the ceremonial and religious heart of the Assyrian Empire while much of the Assyrian army was occupied fighting the Babylonians, and in 612 BCE their combined armies attacked, brutally sacked, and razed Nineveh, the Assyrian capital. Sîn-šar-iškun's fate is unknown, but it is assumed that he died in the defence of his capital. He was succeeded as king only by Aššur-uballiṭ II, possibly his son, who fought his way out of Nineveh and rallied what remained of the Assyrian army at the city of Harran

Despite the catastrophic fall of Assyria during his time as king, there is nothing to suggest that Sîn-šar-iškun was any less competent than his successful warrior-king predecessors who had dominated Western Asia for centuries. He employed the same tactics as his predecessors and appears to have utilized his forces rationally and strategically, fighting entirely in-line with traditional Assyrian warfare. What doomed the Assyrian Empire might instead have been a combination of the weakening of Assyrian military power caused by internal revolts, the lack of an effective defensive plan for the Assyrian heartland, which had not been successfully invaded in over eight hundred years, over expansion of the Assyrian empire leading its military to be spread too thinly, combined with having to face multiple enemies in large numbers which aimed to outright destroy Assyria rather than simply conquer it.

== Background ==
=== Chronology ===
As a consequence of Assyria's violent downfall, the period from a few years before the death of Ashurbanipal to the Fall of Nineveh in 612 BCE suffers from a distinct lack of surviving sources. The annals of Ashurbanipal, the primary sources for his reign, go no further than 636 BCE. Although Ashurbanipal's final year is often repeated as 627 BCE, this follows an inscription at Harran made by the mother of the Neo-Babylonian king Nabonidus nearly a century later. The final contemporary evidence for Ashurbanipal being alive and reigning as king is a contract from the city of Nippur made in 631 BCE. To get the attested lengths of the reigns of his successors to match, most scholars agree that Ashurbanipal either died, abdicated or was deposed in 631 BCE. Of the three options, a death in 631 BCE is the most accepted. If Ashurbanipal's reign would have ended in 627 BCE, the inscriptions of his successors Aššur-etil-ilāni and Sîn-šar-iškun in Babylon, covering several years, would have been impossible since the city was seized by the Neo-Babylonian king Nabopolassar in 626 BCE to never again fall into Assyrian hands.

Ashurbanipal had named his successor as early as 660 BCE, when documents referencing a crown prince (probably Aššur-etil-ilāni) were written. He had been the father of at least one son, and probably two, early on in his reign. These early sons were likely Aššur-etil-ilāni and Sîn-šar-iškun. Aššur-etil-ilāni succeeded Ashurbanipal as king in 631 BCE and ruled until his own death in 627 BCE. It is frequently assumed, without any supporting evidence, that Sîn-šar-iškun fought with Aššur-etil-ilāni for the throne.

Sîn-šar-iškun has sometimes historically and erroneously been known as Esarhaddon II after a letter written by Šērūʾa-ēṭirat, a daughter of Sîn-šar-iškun's grandfather Esarhaddon. The chronology and relations of the royal family were uncertain and Šērūʾa-ēṭirat was believed to have been too young to refer to the famous Esarhaddon. The idea of a separate Esarhaddon II as king has been abandoned by Assyriologists since the late 19th century, but the name sometimes appears as a synonym of Sîn-šar-iškun.

=== Assyria and Babylonia ===
In the middle of the seventh century BCE, the Neo-Assyrian Empire ruled the entire Near East. Due to their powerful standing army and their sophisticated administration, the Assyrians had managed to create the best organized and largest empire that the world had yet seen. Though Babylonia in the south had also once been a large kingdom, it had typically been weaker than its northern neighbor due to internal divisions and the lack of a well-organized army. The population of Babylonia was divided into various ethnic groups with different priorities and ideals. Though old native Babylonians ruled most of the cities, such as Kish, Ur, Uruk, Borsippa, Nippur, and Babylon itself, the Chaldean tribes, led by chieftains who often squabbled with each other, dominated most of the southernmost land. The Arameans lived on the fringes of settled land and were notorious for plundering surrounding territories. Because of the infighting of these three major groups, Babylonia often represented an appealing target for Assyrian campaigns. The two kingdoms had competed since the rise of the Middle Assyrian Empire in the 14th century BCE, and in the 8th century BCE, the Assyrians consistently gained the upper hand. Babylon's internal and external weakness led to its conquest by the Assyrian king Tiglath-Pileser III in 729 BCE.

During the expansion of Assyria into a major empire, the Assyrians had conquered various neighboring kingdoms, either annexing them as Assyrian provinces or turning them into vassal states. Because the Assyrians venerated the long history and culture of Babylon, it was preserved as a full kingdom, either ruled by an appointed client king, or by the Assyrian king in a personal union. The relationship between Assyria and Babylonia was similar to the relationship between Greece and Rome in later centuries; much of Assyria's culture, texts and traditions had been imported from the south. Assyria and Babylonia also shared the same language (Akkadian). The relationship between Assyria and Babylon was emotional in a sense; Neo-Assyrian inscriptions implicitly gender the two countries, calling Assyria the metaphorical "husband" and Babylon its "wife". In the words of the Assyriologist Eckart Frahm, "the Assyrians were in love with Babylon, but also wished to dominate her". Though Babylon was respected as the well-spring of civilization, it was expected to remain passive in political matters, something that Assyria's "Babylonian bride" repeatedly refused to be.

The Assyrians attempted various strategies to appease their Babylonian subjects throughout the eighth and seventh centuries BC; ranging from violent subjugation through war to direct rule either by the Assyrian king or by a representative (sometimes a relative such as a son or brother). Though there was some success in pacifying the urban population of Babylonians, the Arameans and Chaldeans remained unconvinced and repeatedly rebelled whenever they saw an opportunity. Despite the enormous effort spent in keeping the region, Babylonia was seen as too important economically and strategically to allow to secede, but no matter what the Assyrians attempted, rebellion and civil war was the inevitable result each time. Prolonged Assyrian control of Babylonia proved so impossible that modern researchers have dubbed it the "Babylonian problem".

== Reign ==
=== Rise to the throne and revolt of Sîn-šumu-līšir ===
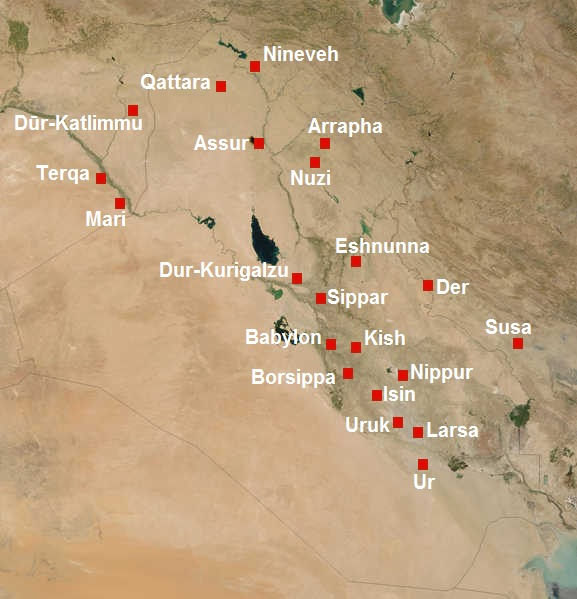
Locations of some major Mesopotamian cities

In the middle of 627 BCE, Ashurbanipal's son and successor Aššur-etil-ilāni died, leading to Aššur-etil-ilāni's brother Sîn-šar-iškun ascending to the Assyrian throne. Although it has been suggested by several historians, there is no evidence to prove the idea that Aššur-etil-ilāni was deposed in a coup by his brother. Sîn-šar-iškun's inscriptions state that he was selected for the kingship from among several of "his equals" (i.e., his brothers) by the gods.

Also dying at roughly the same time as Aššur-etil-ilāni was the vassal king of Babylon, Kandalanu, which led to Sîn-šar-iškun also becoming the ruler of Babylon, as proven by inscriptions by him in southern cities such as Nippur, Uruk, Sippar and Babylon itself. Sîn-šar-iškun's rule of Babylon did not last long, and almost immediately in the wake of him coming to the throne, the general Sîn-šumu-līšir rebelled. Sîn-šumu-līšir had been a key figure in Assyria during Aššur-etil-ilāni's reign, putting down several revolts and possibly being the de facto leader of the country. The rise of another king might have endangered his position and as such led him to revolt and attempt to seize power for himself. Sîn-šumu-līšir was a eunuch and the only eunuch to claim the throne of Assyria. The possibility that a eunuch, normally trusted due to their perceived lack of political ambition, would do so had never been entertained prior to Sîn-šumu-līšir's attempt.

Sîn-šumu-līšir successfully seized control of some cities in northern Babylonia, including Nippur and Babylon itself and would rule there for three months before Sîn-šar-iškun defeated him. Though both of them exercised control there, it is unclear if Sîn-šar-iškun and Sîn-šumu-līšir actually claimed the title "king of Babylon" (or only used "king of Assyria"), meaning that Babylonia could have experienced an interregnum of sorts. Modern historians typically include both Sîn-šumu-līšir and Sîn-šar-iškun in lists of Babylonian kings, as did some ancient Babylonian king lists.

=== Rise of Babylon under Nabopolassar ===
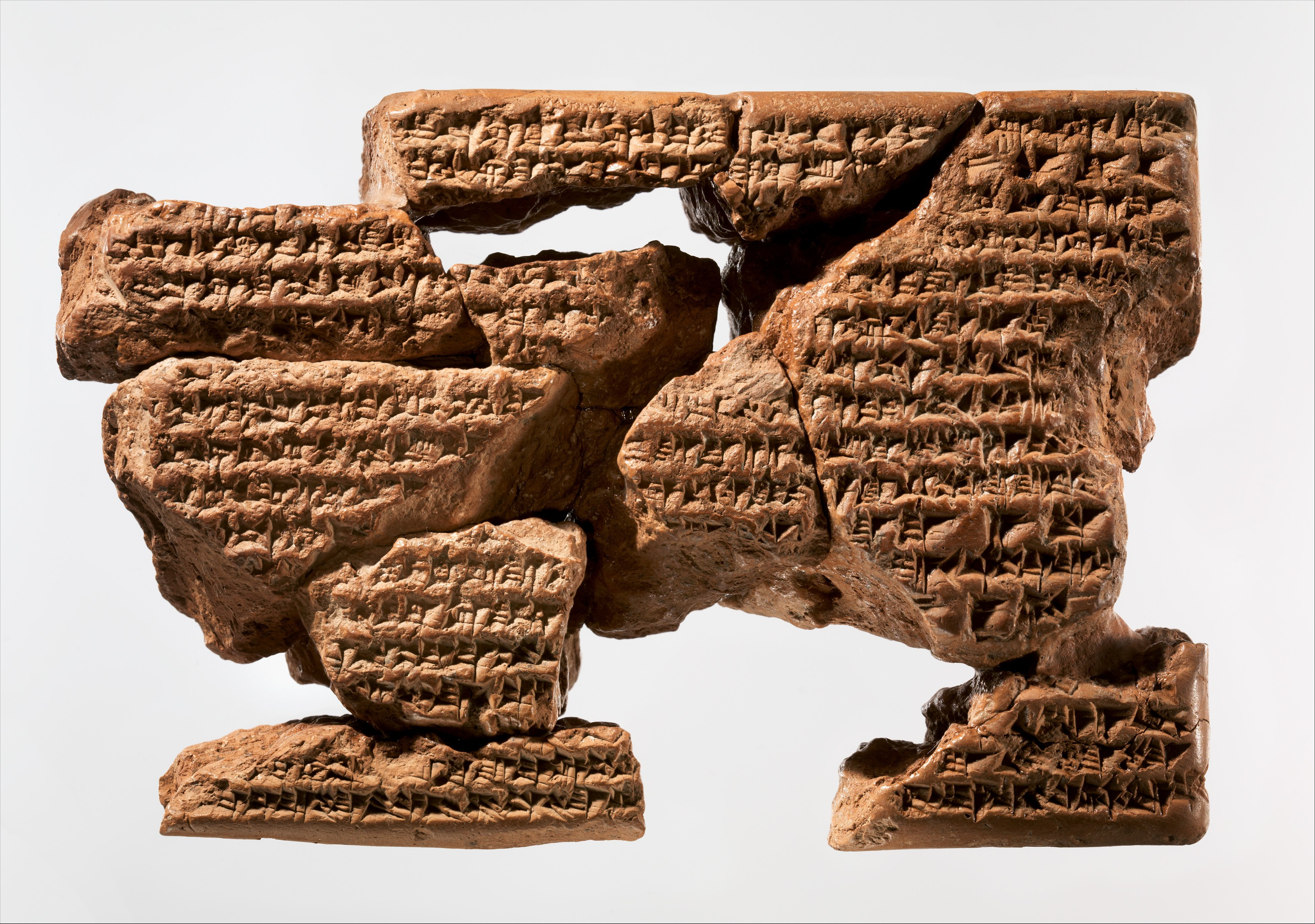
Letter written by Sîn-šar-iškun to his primary enemy, Nabopolassar of Babylon, in which he recognizes him as king of Babylon and pleads to be allowed to retain his kingdom. The authenticity of the letter is a matter of debate.

Some months after Sîn-šumu-līšir's revolt, another revolt began in Babylon. An official or general called Nabopolassar, possibly using the political instability caused by the previous revolt and the ongoing interregnum in the south, assaulted both Nippur and Babylon. (Note: It is also possible that Nabopolassar was an ally of Sîn-šumu-līšir in the previous revolt and merely continued his rebellion, but this theory requires more assumptions without any concrete evidence.) Nabopolassar's armies took the cities from the garrisons left there by Sîn-šar-iškun but the Assyrian response was swift and in October of 626 BCE, the Assyrian army recaptured Nippur and besieged Nabopolassar at Uruk. A simultaneous Assyrian attempt at recapturing Babylon itself, the last Assyrian action against the city, was repulsed by Nabopolassar's garrison and the attack at Uruk also failed.

In the aftermath of the failed Assyrian counterattack, Nabopolassar was formally crowned king of Babylon on November 22/23 626 BCE, restoring Babylonia as an independent kingdom. In 625–623 BCE, Sîn-šar-iškun's forces again attempted to defeat Nabopolassar, campaigning in northern Babylonia. Initially, these campaigns were successful; in 625 BCE the Assyrians took the city of Sippar and Nabopolassar's attempted reconquest of Nippur failed. Another of Assyria's vassals, Elam, also stopped paying tribute to Assyria during this time and several Babylonian cities, such as Der, revolted and joined Nabopolassar. Realizing the threat this posed, Sîn-šar-iškun led a massive counterattack himself which saw the successful recapture of Uruk in 623 BCE.

Sîn-šar-iškun might have ultimately been victorious had it not been for another revolt, led by an Assyrian general in the empire's western provinces in 622 BCE. This general, whose name remains unknown, took advantage of the absence of Sîn-šar-iškun and the Assyrian army to march on Nineveh, met a hastily organized army which surrendered without fighting and successfully seized the Assyrian throne. The surrender of the army indicates that the usurper was an Assyrian and possibly even a member of the royal family, or at least a person that would be acceptable as king. Understandably alarmed by this development, Sîn-šar-iškun abandoned his Babylonian campaign and though he successfully defeated the usurper after a hundred days of civil war, the absence of the Assyrian army saw the Babylonians conquer the last remaining Assyrian outposts in Babylonia in 622–620 BCE. The Babylonian siege of Uruk had begun by October 622 BCE and though control of the ancient city would shift between Assyria and Babylon, it was firmly in Nabopolassar's hands by 620 BCE. Nippur was also conquered in 620 BCE and Nabopolassar pushed the Assyrians out of Babylonia. Though he had successfully driven out the Assyrian army, pro-Assyrian factions still existed in some Babylonian cities, for instance Ur and Nippur, by 617 BCE, making Nabopolassar's full consolidation of control in the south slow. The fighting in Babylonia in the last stages of the localized conflict turned conditions so desperate in some places that parents sold their children into slavery to avoid them starving to death.

=== Fighting in Assyria ===
While unlikely to have been received positively, the end of Assyrian rule in Babylonia would probably not have been regarded as significant to the Assyrians at the time. All fighting had happened in Babylonia and the outcome was not yet decisive, characteristic of previous Assyro-Babylonian conflicts in the Neo-Assyrian period. In previous uprisings, the Babylonians had sometimes temporarily gained the upper hand as well and there was no reason to believe that Nabopolassar's success would be anything but a temporary inconvenience.

In 616 BCE, Nabopolassar entered Assyrian territory for the first time, leading his armies along the Euphrates river into lands in present-day Syria. As he marched on, he took the Assyrian city Hindanu and reached the Balikh River, where he defeated an Assyrian force near the city Gablinu. Nabopolassar then pushed north, reaching as far as the Khabur River. The Assyrians swiftly regrouped in order to deal with the threat. Realizing that the situation was dire, Assyria's ally, Pharaoh Psamtik I of Egypt, marched his troops to aid Sîn-šar-iškun. Psamtik had over the last few years campaigned to establish dominance over the small city-states of the Levant and it was in his interests that Assyria survived as a buffer state between his own empire and those of the Babylonians and Medes in the east. A joint Egyptian-Assyrian campaign to capture the city of Gablinu was undertaken in October of 616 BCE, but ended in failure after which the Egyptian allies kept to the west of the Euphrates, only offering limited support. Both the Assyrians and the Babylonians then withdrew, though the Babylonians retained Hindanu and now controlled the middle Euphrates, a major strategical victory and probably the first step in Nabopolassar's plan to counteract the possibility of an Assyrian invasion of Babylonia. That Nabopolassar withdrew at the same time as the Assyrians did suggests that the Babylonians were not yet ready to conduct a full invasion of Assyria and that their plans were at this time just to secure Babylonian independence, not to conquer and destroy Assyria.

In March 615 BCE, Nabopolassar inflicted a crushing defeat on the Assyrian army at the banks of the Tigris, pushing them back to the Little Zab. This victory weakened Assyrian control of the buffer zone that had established around the middle of the Tigris river between the two kingdoms, meaning that the Babylonians now controlled lands directly bordering the Assyrian heartland itself.

=== Fall of the Assyrian Empire ===
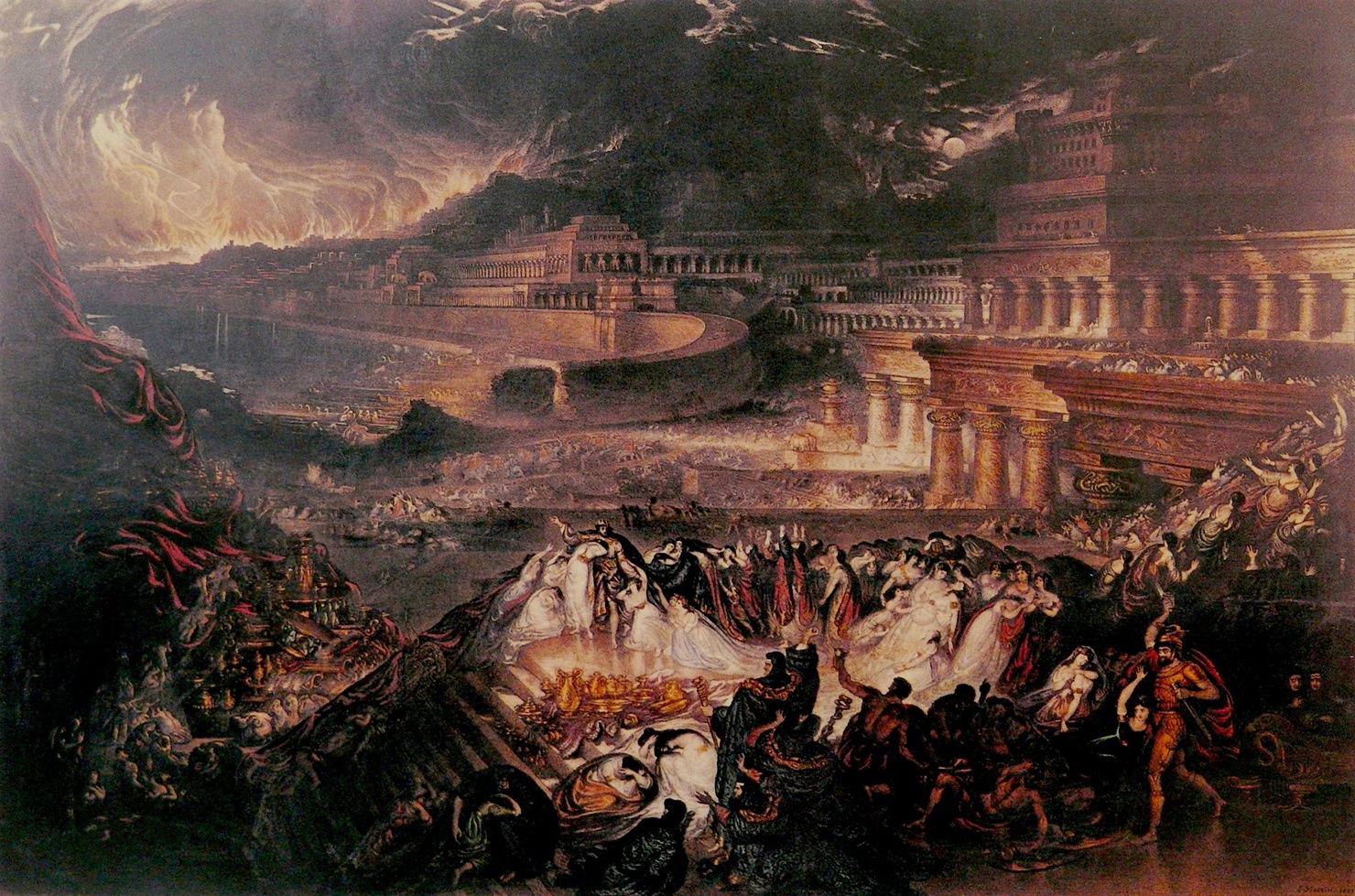
Fall of Nineveh by John Martin (1829)

In May 615 BCE, Nabopolassar and the Babylonians assaulted Assur, the ceremonial and religious center of Assyria and the Assyrian Empire's southernmost remaining city. Sîn-šar-iškun swiftly rallied his army and counterattacked, lifting the siege of Assur and forcing Nabopolassar to retreat to the city of Takrit. There, Sîn-šar-iškun besieged Nabopolassar, but he was eventually forced to abandon the siege. Though the conflict had shifted to Assyria becoming the defender, the war was at this point still being fought according to standard Mesopotamian practice, with attacks, counterattacks and retreats and neither side having the confidence or means to force a decisive confrontation. Despite constant defeats and setbacks, the Assyrian army remained powerful and capable of being deployed rapidly.

In late 615 BCE or in 614 BCE, the Medes under their king Cyaxares entered Assyria and conquered the region around the city of Arrapḫa in preparation for a campaign against Sîn-šar-iškun. Although there are plenty of earlier sources discussing Assyro-Median relations, none are preserved from the period leading up to Cyaxares's invasion and as such, the political context and reasons for the sudden attack are not known. Perhaps, the war between Babylonia and Assyria had disrupted the economy of the Medes and inspired a direct intervention.

In July or August of 614 BCE, the Medes mounted attacks on the cities of Nimrud and Nineveh and successfully conquered the city of Tarbiṣu. They then besieged Assur. This siege was successful and the Medes captured the ancient heart of Assyria, plundering it and killing many of its inhabitants. The brutal sack of Assur came as a shock to people throughout the Near East. Even the Babylonian chronicles, hostile to Assyria, speak of the Medes as unnecessarily brutal, stating that they "inflicted a terrible defeat on a great people, pillaged and looted them and robbed them". Nabopolassar only arrived at Assur after the plunder had already begun and met with Cyaxares, allying with him and signing an anti-Assyrian pact. The treaty between the Babylonians and Medes was sealed through the marriage of Nabopolassar's son and heir, Nebuchadnezzar, and Cyaxares's daughter, Amytis. The onset of winter after the fall of Assur meant that both the Medes and Babylonians then returned to their homelands, preparing for further campaigns in the next year. The Assyrians appear to have not recognized the severity of their situation as they did not use the pause in the fighting to fall back into, and prepare, defensive positions. Instead of repairing the damage in Nimrud, the populace there dismantled the walls further to prepare for future renovation work (which would never happen).

In an attempt to keep the enemies out of Assyria, Sîn-šar-iškun went on the offensive in 613 BCE, attacking Nabopolassar's forces in the middle Euphrates, occupied at the time with suppressing an Assyrian-supported rebellion of a local tribe. Sinshariskun successfully rescued the tribe's besieged city of Rahilu, but Nabopolassar's army retreated before a battle could take place. Around this time, Sîn-šar-iškun, apparently finally recognizing the disaster that was about to befall his kingdom, sent a letter to Nabopolassar, attempting to broker peace. Sîn-šar-iškun pleaded with Nabopolassar to avoid any more bloodshed and wrote that he should "quiet his fuery heart". Nabopolassar was not interested; Sîn-šar-iškun had waited too long and there was no longer anything he could offer that the Babylonians and Medes would not be able to take for themselves in battle. A harsh response was sent, in which Nabopolassar declared that "[Nineveh's] roots I shall pluck out and the foundations of the land I shall obliterate". The original tablets containing these letters have not been preserved, with the known text instead having been derived from tablets made during Seleucid times, centuries later. Whether the letters are copies of authentic, more ancient, originals, or fabrications entirely is a matter of debate.

In April or May 612 BCE, at the start of Nabopolassar's fourteenth year as king of Babylon, the combined Medo-Babylonian army marched on Nineveh. Sîn-šar-iškun rallied his forces to make a final stand at the capital but stood little chance at defending it on account of the city's massive size. From June to August 612 BCE, the Medo-Babylonian army besieged the Assyrian capital and in August the walls were breached, leading to a lengthy and brutal sack. The city was looted, depictions of the Assyrian kings were mutilated and inhabitants as young as the age of ten were slaughtered en masse before the entire city was razed and burned to the ground. Sîn-šar-iškun's fate is not entirely certain but it is commonly accepted that he died in the defense of Nineveh.

== Legacy ==
=== Succession ===
Political map of the Near East ~600 BC. In the aftermath of its fall, the territory of the Neo-Assyrian Empire was divided between the Neo-Babylonian and Median Empires.

With the destructions of Assur in 614 BCE and Nineveh in 612 BCE, the Assyrian Empire had essentially ceased to exist. Sîn-šar-iškun was succeeded by another Assyrian king, Aššur-uballiṭ II, possibly his son and probably the same person as a crown prince mentioned in inscriptions at Nineveh from 626 and 623 BCE. Aššur-uballiṭ established himself at Harran in the west. Because Assur had been destroyed, Aššur-uballiṭ could not undergo the traditional coronation of the Assyrian monarchs and could thus not be invested with the kingship by the god Ashur and because of this, inscriptions from his brief reign indicate that he was viewed as the legitimate ruler by his subjects, but still with the title of crown prince and not king. To the Assyrians, Sîn-šar-iškun was the last true king.

Aššur-uballiṭ's rule at Harran lasted just three years and he fled the city when Nabopolassar's army approached in 610 BCE. An attempt at recapturing Harran carried out with the remnants of the Assyrian army and Egyptian reinforcements in 609 BCE failed, after which Aššur-uballiṭ and the Assyrians he commanded disappear from history, never again to be mentioned in Babylonian sources.

The Biblical Book of Nahum "prophetically" discusses the Fall of Nineveh, but it is unclear when it was written. It may have been written as early as during Ashurbanipal's Egyptian campaign in the 660s BCE, or as late as around the time of Nineveh's actual fall. If it was written around 612 BCE, the "king of Assyria" mentioned would be Sîn-šar-iškun.

King of Assyria, your shepherds slumber; your nobles lie down to rest. Your people are scattered on the mountains with no one to gather them.

— Nahum 3:18, New International Version

=== Reasons for the fall of Assyria ===
Although it has been a commonly circulated idea that one of the primary reasons that led to the fall of the Neo-Assyrian Empire was a civil war between Aššur-etil-ilāni and Sîn-šar-iškun over the throne which weakened Assyria, there is no contemporary text which suggests that this is true. No inscriptions mention a war or even a dispute between the two brothers. There were revolts at the beginnings of both the reign of Aššur-etil-ilāni and Sîn-šar-iškun, but these were minor and dealt with relatively quickly. As such, protracted civil war between contenders to the Assyrian throne was probably not the reason for Assyria's fall.

The primary reason for Assyria's collapse in the reign of Sîn-šar-iškun is more likely to be the failure to resolve the "Babylonian problem" which had plagued Assyrian kings since Assyria first conquered southern Mesopotamia. Despite the many attempts of the kings of the Sargonid dynasty to resolve the constant rebellions in the south in a variety of different ways; Sennacherib's destruction of Babylon and Esarhaddon's restoration of it, rebellions and insurrections remained common. Nabopolassar's revolt was the last in a long line of Babylonian uprisings against the Assyrians and Sîn-šar-iškun's failure to stop it, despite trying for years, doomed his kingdom. The Neo-Babylonian threat, combined with the rise of the Median Empire (Assyria had for many years attempted to stop the formation of a unified Median state through repeated campaigns into Media) culminated in Assyria's destruction.

It would be easy to ascribe Assyria's catastrophic defeat to a weakened Assyrian military and an incompetent king, but there is no evidence to suggest that Sîn-šar-iškun was an incompetent ruler. Assyria was unprepared for foreign attacks into its heartland since the heartland had not been penetrated for five hundred years; no defensive plan existed because in their experience one had never been needed. Sîn-šar-iškun did not use his forces to defend his territory, instead repeatedly going on the offensive, but he kept entirely faithful to the traditional ways of Assyrian warfare. He used the proven principles of war, as used by his successful ancestors before him; supporting rebellions in enemy countries, using flanking maneuvers, concentrating on one point of the position of the enemy and pressing the attack through taking the war to the enemy. Using alternate tactics probably never occurred to him and with an Assyrian mindset considered, he appears to have been a capable military leader who deployed his forces rationally and strategically. In a normal war, he might have been victorious, but he was wholly unprepared to go on the defensive against an enemy that was both numerically superior and that aimed to destroy his country rather than conquer it.

== Titles ==
From one of his inscriptions commemorating his building projects at Nineveh, Sîn-šar-iškun's titles read as follows:

Sîn-šar-iškun, the great king, the mighty king, king of the Universe, [missing portion] chosen of Ashur and Ninlil, beloved of Marduk and Sarpanitum, dear to the heart of [missing portion], the sure choice of the heart of Nabu and Marduk, favorite of [missing portion], whom Ashur, Ninlil, Bêl, Nabu, Sin, Nin-gal, Ishtar of Nineveh, Ishtar of Arbela in the midst of his companions looked upon with sure favor and called his name for the kingship; whom they named in every metropolis, for the priesthood of every sanctuary and for the rule of all the people, to whose aid they kept coming, like his father and mother, slaying his enemies and bringing low his opponents, [missing portion] whom they created for the rulership of the universe and crowned with the crown of rulership among all [missing portion], for the guidance of his subjects, into whose hand Nabu, guardian of all things, placed a righteous scepter and a just staff [missing portion]

In another inscription, commemorating his restoration of a temple, Sîn-šar-iškun incorporates his ancestry:

Sîn-šar-iškun, the great king, the mighty king, king of the Universe, king of Assyria, son of Ashurbanipal, the great king, the mighty king, king of the Universe, king of Assyria, viceroy of Babylon, king of Sumer and Akkad, grandson of Esarhaddon, the great king, the mighty king, king of the Universe, king of Assyria, viceroy of Babylon, king of Sumer and Akkad, great-grandson of Sennacherib, the great king, the mighty king, king of the Universe, king of Assyria, the unrivaled prince, descendant of Sargon, the great king, the mighty king, king of the Universe, king of Assyria, viceroy of Babylon, king of Sumer and Akkad.

== See also ==
- List of Assyrian kings
- Military history of the Neo-Assyrian Empire

== Notes ==
Sîn-šar-iškun Sargonid dynasty Died: August 612 BC
Preceded by Aššur-etil-ilāni	King of Assyria; 627 – 612 BC	Succeeded by Aššur-uballiṭ II
Preceded by Sîn-šumu-līšir	King of Babylon; 626 BC	Succeeded by Nabopolassar
