= Sîn-šumu-līšir =

- King of Assyria; King of Babylon
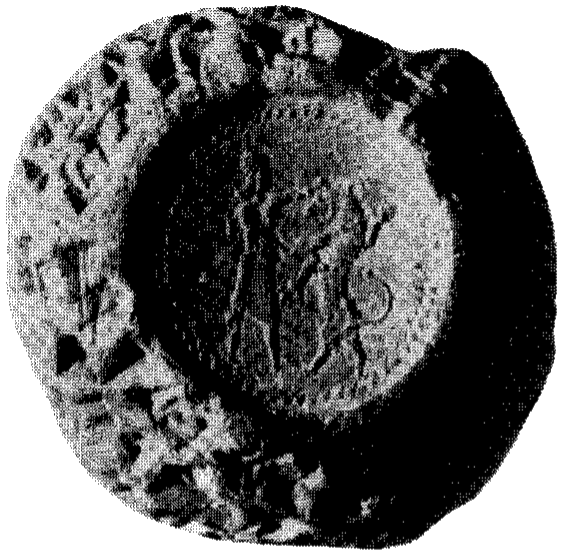
- Undated seal impression from Nineveh depicting a "beardless king" fighting a lion. Since kings were always depicted with beards and eunuchs always without them, it could depict Sîn-šumu-līšir.

Usurper in the Neo-Assyrian Empire
- Reign: 626 BC
- Predecessor: Sîn-šar-iškun
- Successor: Sîn-šar-iškun
- Died: 626 BC
- Akkadian: Sîn-šumu-līšir; Sîn-šumu-lēšir

Sîn-šumu-līšir or Sîn-šumu-lēšir (Neo-Assyrian Akkadian: 𒀭𒌍𒈬𒋛𒁲, romanized: Sîn-šumu-līšir or Sîn-šumu-lēšir, meaning "Sîn, make the name prosper!"), also spelled Sin-shum-lishir, was a usurper king in the Neo-Assyrian Empire, ruling some cities in northern Babylonia for three months in 626 BC during a revolt against the rule of the king Sîn-šar-iškun. He was the only eunuch to ever claim the throne of Assyria.

Nothing is known of Sîn-šumu-līšir's background or family and he first appears as a prominent courtier and general in the reign of Aššur-etil-ilāni (r. 631–627 BC). After the death of Aššur-etil-ilāni's father and predecessor Ashurbanipal (r. 669–631 BC), Sîn-šumu-līšir was instrumental in securing Aššur-etil-ilāni's rise to the throne and consolidating his position as king by defeating attempted revolts against his rule. It is possible that Sîn-šumu-līšir, as a prominent general close to the king, was the de facto ruler of Assyria throughout Aššur-etil-ilāni's reign.

Aššur-etil-ilāni died in 627 BC after a very short reign and in the following year, Sîn-šumu-līšir rebelled against Aššur-etil-ilāni's brother and successor Sîn-šar-iškun, possibly due to feeling that his prominent position was threatened by the rise of the new king. Sîn-šumu-līšir successfully seized cities such as Nippur and Babylon but was defeated by Sîn-šar-iškun after just three months.

== Biography ==
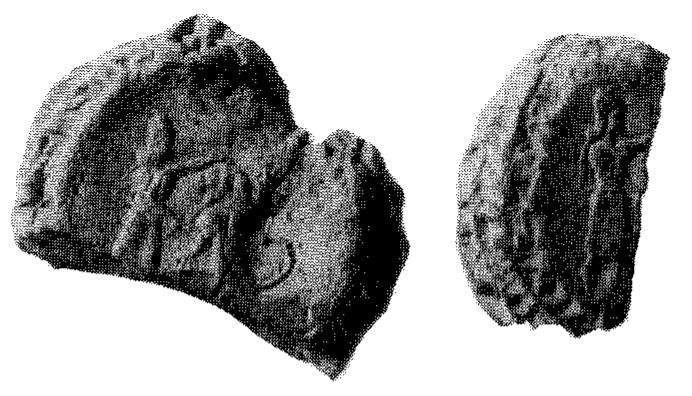
Further "beardless king" seal impressions from Nineveh, possibly depicting Sîn-šumu-līšir.

Nothing is known of Sîn-šumu-līšir's background or family. He was a eunuch and probably already a prominent courtier during the reign of Ashurbanipal (r. 669–631 BC). Eunuchs had often been appointed to prominent government positions in the Assyrian Empire because they could have no dynastic aspirations and thus in the mind of the Assyrians could not represent potential threats. After Ashurbanipal's death, Sîn-šumu-līšir played a key role in securing the rise of his son Aššur-etil-ilāni to the throne, probably with the aid of his own private soldiers. Sîn-šumu-līšir is then first mentioned in Assyrian sources as the rab ša rēši (great/chief eunuch) of Aššur-etil-ilāni. He is likely to have been the head of Aššur-etil-ilāni's household and was probably a prominent general who had served the new king since his youth.

As in many other successions in Assyrian history, Aššur-etil-ilāni's rise to the Assyrian throne in 631 BC was initially met with opposition and unrest. An official named Nabu-riḫtu-uṣur attempted to seize the Assyrian throne with the help of another official called Sîn-šar-ibni. As the king's rab ša rēši, it is likely that Sîn-šumu-līšir played a role in suppressing the conspiracy, which appears to have been crushed relatively quickly. In addition to suppressing the revolt, there is also a preserved tablet which records a treaty imposed by Sîn-šumu-līšir on three private individuals, guaranteeing Aššur-etil-ilāni's sovereignty. The text of this treaty is highly similar to the succession treaties created by Aššur-etil-ilāni's grandfather Esarhaddon in the 670s BC to ensure the succession of Ashurbanipal. Sîn-šumu-līšir is also recorded as receiving land from Aššur-etil-ilāni, possibly as a rewards for his service to the king.

It is possible that Sîn-šumu-līšir, as a prominent general closely tied to the king, was the de facto ruler of Assyria during Aššur-etil-ilāni's reign. Aššur-etil-ilāni died under obscure circumstances in 627 BC, after just four years as king. Aššur-etil-ilāni's Babylonian vassal king Kandalanu also died at roughly the same time and Aššur-etil-ilāni's brother Sîn-šar-iškun assumed rulership of the entire Neo-Assyrian Empire. Immediately after Sîn-šar-iškun became king, Sîn-šumu-līšir rebelled against him, possibly due to feeling that his prominent position was threatened by the rise of a new king. Though a military leader attempting to claim the throne during a time of crisis and succession wasn't necessarily unusual, the possibility that a eunuch would do so had never been entertained prior to Sîn-šumu-līšir's attempt. He was the only eunuch to ever claim the throne of Assyria. It is possible that a set of undated seal impressions from Nineveh containing the image of a beardless king could depict Sîn-šumu-līšir, as Assyrian kings were always depicted with beards but eunuchs were always depicted beardless.

Seeking to seize power for himself, Sîn-šumu-līšir quickly took some key cities in northern Babylonia, including Nippur and Babylon itself. Though his area of control was limited to parts of Babylonia, it is unclear if Sîn-šumu-līšir claimed the title "king of Babylon" in addition to "king of Assyria". Modern historians typically include him in lists of Babylonian kings, as did some ancient Babylonian king lists. Sîn-šumu-līšir never successfully took control of the Assyrian Empire and his tenure as "king" in Nippur and Babylon lasted only three months before Sîn-šar-iškun successfully defeated him. In a later Babylonian epic, the killing of Sîn-šumu-līšir, in the story called the "almighty commander of the eunuchs", is attributed to Nabopolassar (the first king of the Neo-Babylonian Empire), rather than Sîn-šar-iškun.

Despite being a usurper and not successfully taking control of the Assyrian heartland, Sîn-šumu-līšir is routinely listed in modern historiography as one of the final Assyrian kings, together with the legitimate rulers Aššur-etil-ilāni and Sîn-šar-iškun.

== See also ==
- List of Assyrian kings
- Military history of the Neo-Assyrian Empire

Sîn-šumu-līšir Died: 626 BC
Preceded by Sîn-šar-iškun	King of Assyria (Usurper); 626 BC	Succeeded by Sîn-šar-iškun
Preceded by Kandalanu	King of Babylon; 626 BC	Succeeded by Sîn-šar-iškun
