= Pizzey =

Pizzey is a surname. Notable people with the surname include:

- Amos Pizzey (born 1967), British DJ
- Christopher Pizzey (born 1976), British actor
- Erin Pizzey (born 1939), British novelist and family care activist
- Graham Pizzey (1930–2001), Australian author, photographer and ornithologist
- Jack Pizzey (1911–1968), Premier of Queensland in 1968
- Jack Pizzey (television), British television documentary-maker and author
