= Whispering Death =

Whispering Death may refer to

- Bristol Beaufighter, an aircraft of World War II nicknamed "whispering death"
- The Whispering Death, a novel by Daniel Carney
  - Albino (film), also known as Whispering Death, a 1976 German thriller
- Whispering Death, a novel by Garry Disher
- Michael Holding (born 1954), a West Indian cricketer nicknamed "Whispering Death"
- Victorian Railways L class, known as "The Whispering Death", an electric railway engine
- M1 Abrams, nicknamed "whispering death", a tank of the United States Army
- Whispering Death, a Boulder Class dragon from How to Train Your Dragon

== See also ==
- "Whistling Death", a name applied to the Vought F4U Corsair fighter of World War II
