= April in Portugal =

April in Portugal may refer to:

- "April in Portugal" (song), a popular song, also known as "The Whisp'ring Serenade"
- April in Portugal (film), a 1954 film featuring the song
