= Barefoot and Pregnant =

Barefoot and Pregnant may refer to:

- Barefoot and Pregnant (album) by the Dollyrots (2014)
- "Barefoot and Pregnant" (song) by Joan Armatrading (1978)
