= ManKind Initiative =

UK-based domestic violence charity

- Founded: 2001
- Type: Domestic violence charity
- Registration no.: Registered Charity No. 1089547
- Purpose: Domestic violence, gender equality
- Location: Flook House, Belvedere Rd, Taunton, Somerset
- Coordinates: 51°01′17″N 3°06′21″W
- Region served: United Kingdom
- Method: Helpline, research, training, campaigning
- Key people: Mark Brooks
- Revenue: £49,938 (2010)
- Employees: 4
- Website: mankind.org.uk
- Member of the Telephone Helplines Association

The ManKind Initiative is a domestic violence charity based in the United Kingdom and is at the forefront of providing support for male victims of domestic abuse and violence. Since becoming a charity in 2001, it has provided a helpline, training and support for statutory agencies (primarily the police and local authorities) and campaigns to ensure that equal recognition is given to male victims in the same way that recognition is given to female victims of domestic abuse. It is one of only a few charities in the country to help male victims.

The organisation is based in Taunton and was founded in 2001.

== Activities ==
The ManKind Initiative runs a helpline for male victims across the UK, advising and supporting over 100,000 men every year. It refers victims to relevant services or accommodation that might be available to them. The organisation campaigns for recognition of male victims, provision of domestic violence shelters for men and seeks more services at a local level. Due to a lack of funding, the helpline has limited hours.

In 2007, the organization successfully campaigned for Superdrug to remove a man-shaped punching bag aimed at women.

=== Violence is Violence video ===
On 22 May 2014, the organisation released a video titled "Violence is violence" highlighting different public reactions to male and female victims of domestic violence being abused on public. The organisation set up hidden cameras in a London park then filmed the public's reactions to two scenarios: a man abusing a woman and a woman abusing a man. Members of the public intervened when the male attacked the female, with a woman threatening to call the police and another member of the public offering the victim refuge in his office. Meanwhile, in the case of the woman attacking her male partner, members of the public failed to intervene, with many staring and even laughing. The video campaign, created by Dare London, went viral, receiving over 5 million views in less than a week. Mark Brooks of the Mankind Initiative argued that, "A sign of living in an equal society is where men suffering from domestic violence are recognised and supported in the same way that female victims rightly are," adding "The fact that in 2014 this is not the case shows the change that is still needed, especially as many men fear they won't be believed if they come forward." The advert won the 2015 D&AD award for Tactical Branded Film Content & Entertainment.

== Funding ==
The ManKind Initiative has four part-time staff who work alongside volunteers. It receives little funding, with an income of only £49,938 in 2010. Due to the lack of funds the organisation's helpline has faced the possibility of closure on at least two occasions.

The organisation receives no government support, relying on donations. Funding partners include: The Tudor Trust, Lankelly Chase, The Nationwide Foundation, The National Lottery, The Royal Agricultural University, Newman University, Weston-Super-Mare Carnival and Hogg Robinson.

== Patrons and supporters ==
The organisation's patrons include Erin Pizzey (founder of the world first domestic violence shelters), Lord Cotter, John Penrose MP and Liz Lynne MEP from 1999–2012.

The Chairman is Mark Brooks and the organisation has six trustees. As a result of his work at the ManKind Initiative, Brooks was awarded an OBE in the 2019 New Year Honours, with the honour given "for services to male victims of domestic abuse".

== See also ==
- Parity (charity)
- Women's Aid Federation of England
- Erin Pizzey
- Refuge (United Kingdom charity)
- Earl Silverman
