= Catlow =

1971 film by Sam Wanamaker

- Directed by: Sam Wanamaker
- Screenplay by: Scott Finch; J.J. Griffith
- Based on: Catlow; 1963 novel by Louis L'Amour
- Produced by: Euan Lloyd
- Starring: Yul Brynner; Richard Crenna; Leonard Nimoy; Daliah Lavi; Jo Ann Pflug
- Cinematography: Ted Scaife
- Edited by: Alan Killick
- Music by: Roy Budd
- Production company: MGM
- Distributed by: MGM
- Release date: October 20, 1971 (U.S.)
- Running time: 101 minutes
- Countries: United States; United Kingdom
- Language: English
- Budget: $2 million

Catlow is a 1971 American Western film, based on a 1963 novel of the same name by Louis L'Amour. It stars Yul Brynner as Jed Catlow, a renegade outlaw determined to pull off a Confederate gold heist. It co-stars Richard Crenna and Leonard Nimoy. Nimoy mentioned this film in both of his autobiographies because it gave him a chance to break away from his role as Spock on Star Trek. He mentioned that the time he made the film was one of the happiest of his life, even though his part was rather brief. The film contains a lot of tongue-in-cheek and sardonic humor, especially between Brynner and Crenna's characters Catlow and Ben Cowan.

== Plot ==
Jed Catlow and Ben Cowan served together in the Civil War and became friends but now Catlow is a thief and Cowan a marshal tracking him down. Catlow is accused of rustling cattle, especially from the wealthy rancher Parkman. Parkman has hired vicious gunfighter Orville Miller to kill Catlow. Offering to turn himself in, Catlow joins Cowan on a stagecoach to Fort Smith but his men stage an ambush. Catlow heads for Hermosillo, Mexico, where a woman named Rosita is in love with him and a $2 million shipment of gold is arriving soon by mule train. The ranchers send Cowan after him along with Miller. Catlow gets the drop on Miller during a bath and hits him with a jug that shatters, cutting Miller's vocal cords. After a later confrontation, Catlow tosses the bound Cowan across a horse with a badge pinned on his backside and turns him loose.

Cowan is bushwhacked by Miller and later rescues Diego Recalde, the nephew of Mexican General Calderon who had been attacked by Apaches. Both are attacked by Apaches and Cowan barely avoids a plunge to his death off a cliff. Allowed to recover at General Calderon's grand hacienda because he saved Recalde, Cowan becomes attracted to Christina, the general's daughter. After stealing the army's gold, Catlow flees toward the scorching desert and into dangerous Apache territory. He rejects Rosita, who angrily recruits men to go with her after Catlow and kill him. Cowan follows, as usual, but Miller shows up and shoots Cowan, wounding him. Catlow picks up Cowan's gun and shoots Miller. Christina will take care of Cowan. Meantime, a smiling Catlow puts on Cowan's badge and gives an indication that he will turn to the right side of the law.

== Cast ==
- Yul Brynner as Jed Catlow
- Richard Crenna as Marshal Ben Cowan
- Leonard Nimoy as Orville Miller
- Daliah Lavi as Rosita
- Jo Ann Pflug as Christina Calderon
- Jeff Corey as Merridew
- Michael Delano as Rio
- Julián Mateos as Diego Recalde
- David Ladd as Caxton
- Bob Logan as Oley
- John Clark as Keleher
- Dan van Husen as Dutch
- Bessie Love as Mrs. Frost
- José Nieto as General Calderon
- Walter Coy as Parkman

== Production ==
The film was produced by Euan Lloyd, who had made a film of Louis L'Amour's novel Shalako. In June 1968, he announced he had bought the screen rights to another L'Amour novel, Catlow. The script was written by Scott Finch who had written Shalako. In June 1970, L'Amour said the film would be the first of five made from his novels starring Stephen Boyd, the others being Down the Long Hills, Flint, Radigan, and Hanging Woman Creek. Raising the finance for Shalako had been complicated but Lloyd managed to get the entire budget for Catlow from MGM.

The film was to have been directed by Peter Hunt. However, Sam Wanamaker ended up doing the job. In March 1971, Yul Brynner signed to star. Within the month, Richard Crenna, Leonard Nimoy and David Ladd had been cast. Filming took place in Almería, Spain in August 1971. "This picture has a sense of humour but that's not the same as being a comedy Western," said Wanamaker.

== Reception ==
Lloyd ended up producing The Man Called Noon, also based on a L'Amour novel. He bought the rights to ten more for $1 million. However he produced no further L'Amour adaptations.

Quentin Tarantino called it "along with Burt Kennedy's Dirty Dingus Magee & Andrew V. McLaglen's Something Big... my nomination for worst studio western of the seventies", in which Brynner gives "the worst performance of his career."

It grossed $159,500 in its first week from 29 theaters, finishing seventh for the week at the box office in the United States and Canada.

== See also ==
- List of American films of 1971
