= CESPA =

CESPA may refer to:

- Compañía Española de Petróleos (CEPSA), Spanish Petroleum Company
- Parity (charity), previously called Campaign for Equal State Pension Ages
