= Lisa I'Anson =

British broadcaster

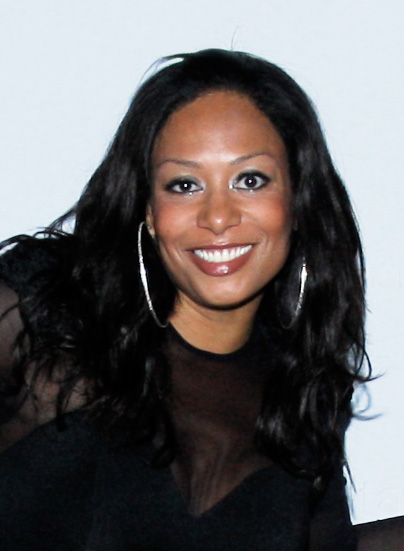
- Lisa I'Anson in 2009
- Born: 31 May 1965 (age 61)
- Occupations: Radio presenter; Television presenter; VJ
- Years active: 1989-present
- Spouse: Amos Pizzey
- Children: 2

Lisa I'Anson (/aɪˈænsən/, born 31 May 1965) is a British radio presenter, television presenter, and VJ.

== Career ==
I'Anson first started as a broadcaster on the then pirate radio station Kiss FM, and through to its legal licence, presenting the magazine show The Word.

From 1988 to 1995, she was a VJ on the MTV Europe, first presenting MTV News At Night, and then onto the MTV Hit List.

From 1995 to 1996, she presented the weekday lunchtime show on BBC Radio 1, taking over from Emma Freud. She then presented the weekend lunchtime show from 1997 to 1999.

In August 1998, during Radio 1's annual visit to Ibiza, I'Anson failed to turn up for work after a night of clubbing. Although it has been widely reported that she was sacked by the BBC as a direct result, she was reportedly given a final warning, had her wages docked, and was made to issue an apology to her fellow presenters and crew and left the station by "amicable agreement" six months later.

Between 2000 and 2003 I'Anson presented a weekday discussion programme on BBC London 94.9. In 2008, she hosted a Sunday afternoon show on London radio station Magic 105.4.

In January 2005, I'Anson was a contestant in the third series of Celebrity Big Brother.

I'Anson has presented on television programmes such as The Vibe (on BBC Two), the MOBO Awards, and narrated programmes such as Ibiza Uncovered.

I'Anson currently presents a show on Solar Radio.

== Personal life ==
I'Anson has a Ghanaian mother and English father. She is married to Amos Pizzey (son of equality campaigner Erin Pizzey). They live in Los Angeles and have a daughter. I'Anson has a son from her first marriage.
