= The Square Circle =

The Square Circle is a 1982 novel by Daniel Carney. It was adapted as the 1985 film Wild Geese II.

After the success of his novel, The Wild Geese (1977) (originally titled The Thin White Line), Carney was asked by producer Euan Lloyd to write a follow-up. Lloyd had already turned The Thin White Line into the hit movie The Wild Geese, and was constantly being asked to make a sequel. At first Carney refused as he just couldn't come up with a premise for the story, Lloyd wouldn't be put off and suggested the theme could be the rescue of Rudolf Hess from Spandau Prison in West Berlin.

== Plot ==
Harvard 1980, a radical human rights activist group are seeking a way to put their group into the public eye. Member Kathy Lakas suggests they organise the rescue of Rudolf Hess, then being held for nearly 40 years since the end of the Second World War. Lakas, given the permission to employ a mercenary soldier to plan the rescue bid, hires Lebanese mercenary John Haddad. Haddad accepts the offer in part and travels to West Berlin, in the heart of East Germany, to conduct a reconnaissance into the feasibility of the operation. While in West Berlin, Haddad is kidnapped by a mysterious group of vicious Germans led by an ill looking middle aged man. They already know who Haddad is and have guessed why he is in Berlin, but they torture him all the same and leave him for dead. Hospitalised from the beating, Haddad is visited by British Army Major Reed-Henry who questions him on his activities. He shows Haddad photographs of the men who attacked him, revealing the leader as Karl Stroebling, a KGB operative and terrorist group leader. Again Reed-Henry already suspects why Haddad is in Berlin, but leaves it at that.

Next day Haddad is joined by Kathy who is shocked by his injuries. Still unsure whether to accept the contract, Haddad realises he needs someone to watch his back and allow him to work without the threat of Stroebling. Haddad travels to Paris, where he locates an old comrade, Maroun, who has been contracted to assassinate a Palestinian military leader. Maroun agrees to join up with Haddad after he's completed his current job and protect Haddad in Berlin from Stroebling and his group. While in Paris Hadad meets Kathy's brother Michael, who's also a senior member of Kathy's group.

Haddad returns to West Berlin to continue with his reconnaissance while Kathy returns to the States, back there she learns her fellow committee members want to pull the plug on the project. Kathy strongly objects to their plan and decides to fund the rescue with her brother personally by selling a valuable family heirloom. Back in West Berlin, Haddad is approached by an American Army Major, Tom Dade. Dade an old friend of the Lakas' is keen to help and suggests that Haddad seek out Reed-Henry for assistance in rescuing Hess.

== Characters ==
- John Haddad - Lebanese mercenary, veteran of the Lebanese Civil War and wanted by Palestinian terrorists.
- Kathy Lakas - leads an American human rights committee to force the release of political prisoners.
- Maroun - American born Lebanese mercenary, expert sniper who's become an assassin for whoever pays.
- Michael Lakas - senior member of the human rights committee and Kathy's brother.
- Karl Stroebling - East German terrorist leader working for the Soviets, formerly a right-wing terrorist before switching to the Soviets.
- Major Reed-Henry - a British Army officer station in West Berlin who is also an undercover operative for the British secret services.
- Pierre Helou - Lebanese racing driver and former comrade of Haddad, lives in West Berlin with his wife and son and daughter.
- Joseph and Jamil Koury - Lebanese brothers and mercenary comrades of Haddad.
- Patrick Hourigan - I.R.A. terrorist currently working for Stroebling after becoming known in Northern Ireland.
- Warrant Officer Cooksley - Hess's personal warder who helps Hadad on the bequest of Reed-Henry.
- Major Tom Dade - American Army officer serving in West Berlin who seems keen to help the Lakas'.
- Rudolf Hess - prisoner no. 7 at Spandau Prison and the world's most closely guarded man.
