= Flight of the Wild Geese (song) =

1978 song by Joan Armatrading

Single by Joan Armatrading

from the album The Wild Geese
- B-side: "No Way Out"
- Released: 30 June 1978
- Length: 1:59
- Label: A&M
- Songwriter: Joan Armatrading
- Producer: David Anderle

Joan Armatrading singles chronology
| "Warm Love" (1978) | "Flight of the Wild Geese" (1978) | "Bottom to the Top" (1978) |

"Flight of the Wild Geese" is a song written and recorded by English singer-songwriter Joan Armatrading as the theme to the 1978 war film The Wild Geese. It was included on the film's soundtrack and was also issued as a single on 30 June 1978 by A&M Records. The song was written by Armatrading and produced by David Anderle.

== Background ==
Armatrading had "always wanted to write for films", so she readily accepted when she was approached to write the theme song to The Wild Geese. She was given a pre-release showing of the film before writing the song.

At the time of its release, Armatrading received some criticism for writing the theme for a film based on a group of European mercenaries fighting in Africa. She defended her decision, telling the Sunday Mercury in 1978, "I saw the film and didn't get too caught up with it being black against white. I saw it as a 'Boy's Own' adventure. At the premiere people shouted that I had sold out, but I had done nothing of the kind. The film was saying Africa is not just for black or white but for everyone to get together and work it out." She added to Record Mirror, "I like the film. Okay, so it shows white guys killing black guys, but the story does carry a message – that we're all equal and should be able to live together."

== Release ==
"Flight of the Wild Geese" was released as a single in the UK on 30 June 1978. It was primarily promoted through the advertising for the film. Although it failed to enter the top 75 of the UK singles chart, the song received airplay on BBC Radio 1 and across Independent Local Radio. It spent five consecutive weeks on Record Business magazine's Airplay Guide, reaching its peak of number 47 in its second week.

Armatrading was unhappy with the single's picture sleeve, which closely resembled the film's poster. She told Sounds in 1978, "I didn't like the sleeve. That was wrong. I didn't want it. I was told it wouldn't happen and it still did."

== Critical reception ==
Upon its release, Bill Swift of Blues & Soul called "Flight of the Wild Geese" "quite pleasant and well presented". Peter Trollope of the Liverpool Echo said that the "haunting number should be a big hit for Joan because of the film's exposure". Dave Murray of the Reading Evening Post concluded, "Not bad, although Joan has done much better work." Tony Jasper, writing for Music Week, called Armatrading "obviously very talented" but felt the song "makes for [an] unattractive record" as there is "no recognisable tune". He noted that it uses the "usual quick, now predictable entry of drums plus too many high non-song colouring notes". He did not believe it would "sell too many copies [or] restore Armatrading's sagging single performance of late unless [the] film becomes [a] major box office success". A reviewer for the Darlington Evening Despatch stated, "The lady's name alone is good enough to guarantee success, [but] with a melody that is difficult to pick out and follow, she may have to rely on her reputation this time round." Pete Silverton of Sounds described it as "over-orchestrated" and did not think the song matched the "quality material that first brought [Armatrading] to general notice". He noted that the "flute wanders around a bit too mushily" and "even her remarkable voice sounds at times totally unsure of which way it's going". Steve Evans of the Coventry Evening Telegraph was negative in his review, writing, "The lady with the deepest voice around puts plenty into this – but the powerful vocals don't rescue a poor song. It's the film soundtrack, I hope the film's better."

== Track listing ==
7–inch single (UK, Spain, Italy and South Africa)

1. "Flight of the Wild Geese" – 1:59
2. "No Way Out" – 2:11

7–inch single (Australasia)

1. "Flight of the Wild Geese" – 1:59
2. "Get in the Sun" – 3:20

7–inch single (Japan)

1. "Flight of the Wild Geese" – 1:59
2. "Parade Ground (Dogs of War)" – 1:44

== Personnel ==
Production

- David Anderle – production ("Flight of the Wild Geese")
- Glyn Johns – production ("No Way Out", "Get in the Sun")

== Charts ==
| Chart (1978) | Peak position |
|---|---|
| UK The Airplay Guide (Record Business) | 47 |
