= Lauren Luke =

English make-up artist (born 1981)

- Born: December 8, 1981 (age 44); South Shields, Tyne and Wear, England
- Other name: Panacea81
- Occupations: Makeup artist, YouTuber, entrepreneur
- Years active: 2007–present
- Known for: Makeup tutorials on YouTube, "By Lauren Luke" cosmetics line
- Notable work: "Looks By Lauren Luke" (book)
- Website: YouTube Channel

Lauren Luke (born 8 December 1981) is an English YouTube personality who became known for creating make-up tutorials on Panacea81, one of the most popular channels during the early years of YouTube.

== Early life ==
Luke was born in South Shields in the North-East of England in 1981. She has three sisters. Luke worked as a taxi dispatcher before she began to sell cosmetics from home via eBay, and provide accompanying make-up tutorials online.

== Career ==
Luke's video tutorials showed viewers how to apply make-up to recreate various looks, including some that were inspired by celebrities such as Avril Lavigne, Jennifer Lopez, Miley Cyrus, Amy Lee, Leona Lewis, and more. Her YouTube channel, Panacea81, has had 135 million views and over 500,000 subscribers since her first upload on 22 July 2007. Luke chose the alias Panacea81 by pairing the Greek Goddess's name Panacea with her birth year, 1981. Luke became a YouTube site partner and was one of the most subscribed YouTube users in the UK in 2008.

In November 2008, Luke was featured in a BBC documentary called Inside Out. The Guardian then recruited Luke to write a beauty column, which she updated weekly until September 2009. In March 2009, a second, more in-depth documentary about Luke and her life aired as part of a documentary series titled Natalie Cassidy's Real Britain, on BBC Three.

On 27 April 2009, Luke unveiled a proprietary signature cosmetics line called By Lauren Luke. Sephora launched the line in 135 stores across the United States and Canada on 21 September 2009. On 1 October 2009, Hodder & Stoughton released Luke's book, Looks By Lauren Luke, in the UK. Luke introduced her book on BBC Radio 4's Woman's Hour and Channel 4's The Paul O'Grady Show. In November 2009, Luke featured as an avatar in the Nintendo DS game, Supermodel Makeover By Lauren Luke.

One of Luke's videos appeared in the 2014 movie Laggies starring Keira Knightley and Chloë Grace Moretz. Both protagonists were shown watching Luke's video while trying to replicate the look (smokey eye).

== Advocacy ==
In July 2012, Luke teamed up with Refuge, a UK-based advocacy group, to produce a video as part of their Don't Cover It Up campaign to encourage women who have been victims of domestic violence to report incidents. The video depicted Luke starting out in the usual tutorial manner; however, she was then shown using foundation to cover up bruises from an implied beating. While Luke was already well known in the UK, the video was promoted by the National Organization for Women in the United States, and reported on internationally. Luke noted that, "The bruising on my face for the video wasn't real, but my emotions in that video were. I had a bad experience in the past with a previous boyfriend. He never physically hurt me but I did sometimes fear what would happen next if I said the wrong thing. He could be overprotective and embarrass me in front of my work colleagues or friends because of his aggressive behaviour. Sometimes it was like living with a volcano which could erupt at any second—I felt I was walking on egg shells just to keep him from exploding and smashing something across the room."

== Hiatus and return ==
Luke ceased uploading regular tutorials in 2014, and over the following four years, only made occasional appearances on her YouTube channel with updates about her life. Luke subsequently returned to posting make-up videos, but revealed in a video uploaded on 15 June 2018, that she no longer works as a make-up artist.

== Personal life ==
Luke has spoken out about having been bullied when she was younger over her looks and weight. She has a son named Jordan from an early relationship. Luke married her husband, Martin Buxton in Gretna Green in November 2020.
