= Earl Silverman =

Domestic abuse survivor and men's rights advocate

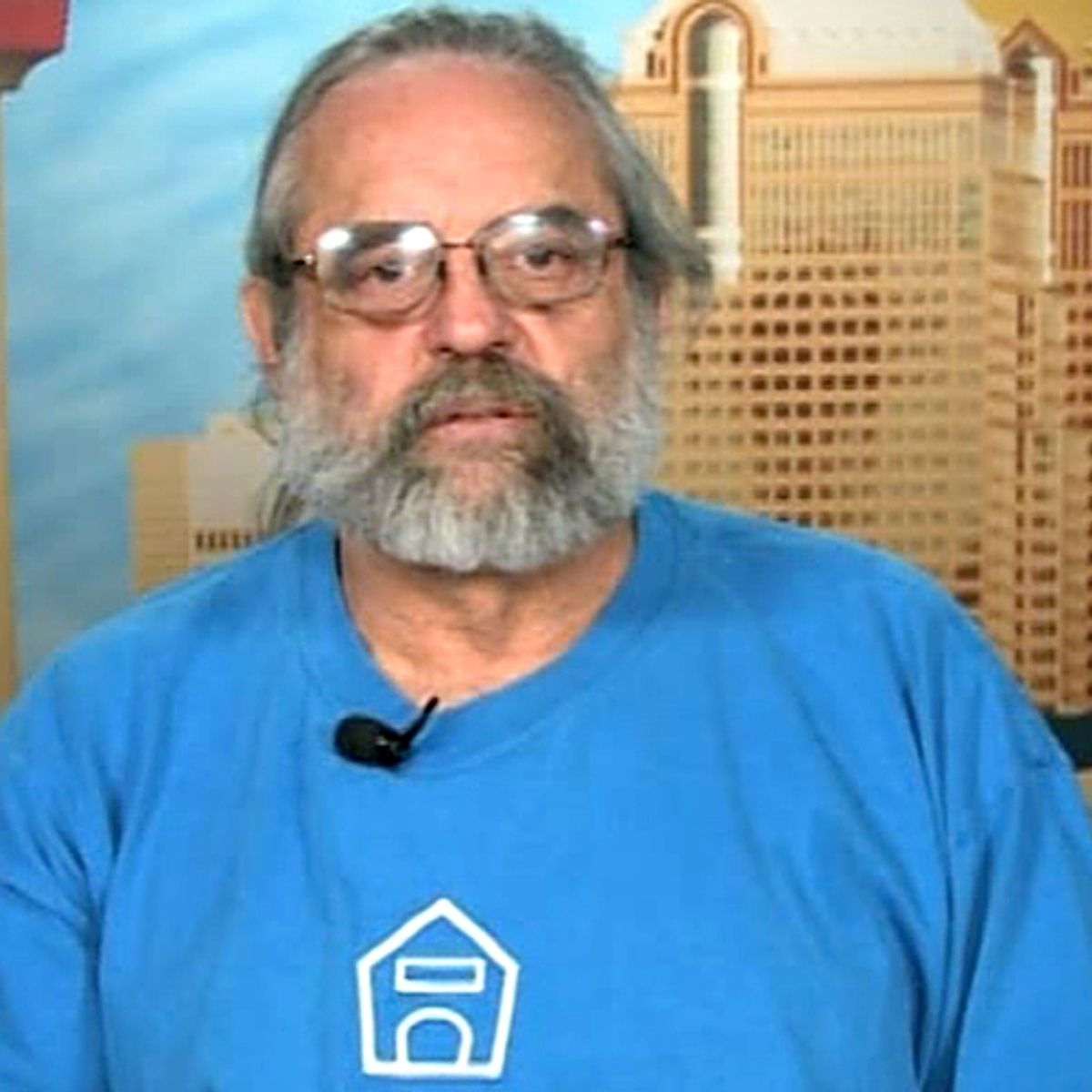
- Born: July 4, 1948
- Died: April 26, 2013 (aged 64); Calgary, Alberta, Canada
- Cause of death: Suicide by hanging
- Organization(s): Men's Alternative Safe House; Family of Men Society; National Coalition for Men
- Title: Founder and President, Family of Men Society; Founder, Men's Alternative Safe House; Canadian Liaison, National Coalition for Men
- Movement: Men's rights movement

Earl Silverman (4 July 1948 – 26 April 2013) was a Canadian domestic abuse survivor, activist and men's rights advocate who founded the Men's Alternative Safe House (MASH), the only privately funded domestic abuse shelter for men in Canada, and the Family of Men society, which operated phone lines to assist victims. He also served as the Canadian Liaison for the National Coalition for Men. June 14 is unofficially "Earl Silverman Day."

Earl died by suicide on April 26, 2013, shortly after selling the shelter due to bankruptcy and ridicule.

== Biography ==
Silverman, originally from Montreal, moved to Calgary in 1978.

He escaped his violent and abusive wife some time before 1991, but was unable to find a domestic abuse shelter that could take him in, and he would face ridicule at the hands of the police, which he said ultimately caused him to retaliate in defense. While plenty of shelters for women existed, the only publicly funded services available for men were for anger management. "As a victim, I was re-victimized by having these services telling me that I wasn't a victim, but I was a perpetrator," Silverman told the National Post.

After leaving his home, Silverman had spiraled into self-abuse and alcoholism, attempting suicide due to helplessness.

=== Family of Men society ===
Silverman founded the Family of Men support society, and served as president and program coordinator for the organization. The society maintained a telephone crisis line for over a decade to assist men in matters of abuse. The society was founded around 1992, and it reportedly faced problems seeking funding from local governments.

=== Men's Alternative Safe House ===
MASH4077 (Full form: Men's Alternative Safe House) was started in the early 2000s, in Earl's own house in Calgary, making it the only privately funded shelter for male victims of domestic abuse in Canada. It was listed in the SAFE (Stop Abuse For Everyone) list of resources as early as May 2004.

An erroneous claim that MASH4077 took in its first refugee in 2011, which appears on a number of other websites, is based on a misreading of Earl's announcement in 2011 on the NCFM website, not of the first time a male victim had been housed by MASH4077, but of the first time a male victim had been both referred by the local provincial government and funded by a grant (of $1,000) from them, thus making Earl optimistic that his decade's-long advocacy on behalf of male domestic violence victims was finally being recognized as legitimate. MASH hosted about 20 fleeing men and children in the first four months of 2013 before being shut down. With no public funds to help, Silverman funded the running costs and bills himself, failing to raise significant amounts from either government or private donations.

"Family violence has gone from a social issue to only a woman's issue. So any support for men is interpreted as being against women," said Silverman in an interview with Beacon News.

In early 2013, Silverman announced that the sanctuary would be closing because he could no longer afford to run it due to a lack of funding. He sold the house shortly after to a man named Steven Howitt, and died by suicide the next day.

== Death ==
Silverman was found dead by hanging in his garage on April 26, 2013, in an apparent suicide. His body was discovered by Howitt, who called for help but was unable to save him. Earl left a four-page suicide note, condemning the government for failing to recognize male victims of domestic abuse. Financial ruin and ridicule were said to have contributed to his suicide. Silverman also wrote that he hoped his death would bring more awareness to the issue of male abuse.

== Legacy ==
Silverman's will directed that the funds from his estate should be dispersed so as to create an 'educational scholarship for male victims of female perpetrated domestic violence.' The superior court of Alberta directed that the funds should be directed to the Mount Royal University Foundation for this purpose.

Erin Pizzey, writer and founder of Refuge, said Silverman 'was a martyr to the indifference of the Canadian Government, and we will never forget his name,' and noted that she worried there will be no change in the 'stone-hearted' Canadian government. Men's rights publication A Voice for Men penned Silverman's legacy as "one of providing shelter and help to human beings that the rest of our society is content to see abused, homeless, and disregarded to their deaths."

Then Wildrose Party leader Danielle Smith tweeted her condolences, stating she was "reflecting on what he spent his life fighting for."

== See also ==
- Domestic violence against men
- Erin Pizzey
- Marc Angelucci
- Men's rights movement
