= Wild Geese II =

1985 British film

- Theatrical release poster
- Directed by: Peter Hunt
- Screenplay by: Reginald Rose
- Based on: The Square Circle; 1982 novel by Daniel Carney
- Produced by: Euan Lloyd
- Starring: Scott Glenn; Barbara Carrera; Edward Fox; Laurence Olivier; Robert Freitag; Kenneth Haigh; Stratford Johns; Derek Thompson; Robert Webber
- Cinematography: Michael Reed
- Edited by: Keith Palmer
- Music by: Roy Budd
- Production companies: Frontier Films; Thorn EMI Screen Entertainment
- Distributed by: Thorn EMI Screen Entertainment
- Release date: 18 October 1985
- Running time: 125 minutes
- Country: United Kingdom
- Language: English
- Budget: £11 million

Wild Geese II is a 1985 British action-thriller film directed by Peter Hunt, based on the 1982 novel The Square Circle by Daniel Carney, in which a group of mercenaries are hired to spring Rudolf Hess from Spandau Prison in Berlin. The film is a sequel to the 1978 film The Wild Geese, which was also produced by Euan Lloyd and adapted from a novel by Carney. Richard Burton, who starred in the first film as Colonel Allen Faulkner, was planning to reprise his role, but died days before filming began. The sequel has Faulkner's brother Alex (played by Edward Fox) as one of the mercenaries. No characters from the original are featured in the sequel.

== Plot ==
In 1977 Africa, veteran mercenary Allen Faulkner leads fifty hired soldiers in a mission to rescue deposed President Julius Limbani. After rescuing the president, the team is double-crossed and Faulkner's men are attacked in the open by a hostile airplane. Faulkner tries to escape with a handful of survivors in an antique Dakota aeroplane. His best friend Rafer Janders is wounded trying to reach the plane, and Faulkner kills him, at Jander's request, to prevent his capture and likely torture.

In 1982 London, Robert McCann and Michael Lukas discuss a planned rescue of Rudolf Hess, the only surviving Nazi leader in captivity. Hess has secrets that could destroy the careers of prominent political figures, while an international news network will pay any price to expose those secrets. Allen's brother Alex Faulkner meets with network executives, and refuses the request of Michael and his sister Kathy to free Hess. On Alex's recommendation, they employ John Haddad, a former Lebanese-American soldier turned mercenary to spirit Hess out of West Berlin.

Haddad stakes out Spandau Prison by joining a construction crew and drafts plans of the complex. Haddad is abducted by Karl Stroebling, a Nazi working for the Soviet Union, who tortures Haddad to obtain details about his mission. Haddad overpowers his captors and escapes, and is questioned in hospital by British Colonel Reed-Henry, suspicious he is there to rescue Hess. Haddad goes to Bavaria with Kathy to plan the mission without interference from Stroebling, where Haddad enlists his old mercenary comrade Faulkner. The trio returns to West Berlin to find Reed-Henry will help, claiming the British secretly want Hess gone so the Soviet military presence in the British sector can end. Haddad and Faulkner fight off another attack by Stroebling's thugs.

Haddad agrees to hand Hess to Reed-Henry in exchange for help from Regimental Sergeant Major James Murphy, an ex-warden at Spandau Prison. Murphy describes the prison routine and disguises the mercenaries as British Royal Military Police. Haddad refuses an offer by Stroebling to remove the contract on Haddad's life in exchange for Hess and the death of Faulkner. Stroebler tries to blackmail Haddad by kidnapping Kathy who has become romantically involved with Haddad. In exchange for guarantees of her safety, Haddad adds Patrick Hourigan, one of Stroebling's gang, to the rescue group. Murphy trains the group, which includes Haddad, Faulkner, Hourigan, Michael and Lebanese mercenaries Joseph and Jamil Koury.

When Hourigan taunts Murphy about an IRA ambush in which he participated, Murphy shoots him dead, putting Kathy's safety in question. Haddad enlists Arab businessman Mustapha El Ali and his employees to participate in the rescue. Haddad offers Michael as extra insurance to appease Stroebling, then attempts to rescue both. Michael sacrifices himself and Kathy is rescued.

Haddad mounts his mission, with the news network, Reed-Henry and Stroebling each believing they will receive Hess. Fairground wall-of-death rider Pierre Helou stages a traffic collision but is killed in the process. Hess is sedated with an anaesthetic, switched with a look-alike corpse from an ambulance, and placed into a waiting jeep. At the rendezvous point at the Kaiser Wilhelm Memorial, Reed-Henry tries to intercept Hess but discovers that he's been duped into killing Stroebling disguised as a guard. Kathy, Haddad and Faulkner take Hess to and from a football game and travel with Austrian fans to an East German airport. After killing a customs officer, they flee aboard a flight to Vienna. Reed-Henry confesses to his Russian superiors that Hess escaped and is executed.

Haddad, Kathy and Faulkner take Hess to a hotel in Vienna. Hess tells them he has no desire to be a part of modern society and regrets the millions of deaths caused by the Nazis. Haddad and Faulkner try to talk him into accepting his freedom but he insists on going back to Spandau to live out the rest of his life. The following day, Haddad, Kathy and Faulkner take Hess to the French embassy, where he turns himself in. A newspaper article in the following days tells a story about a false rumour of Hess' escape.

== Cast ==
- Scott Glenn as John Haddad
- Barbara Carrera as Kathy Lukas
- Edward Fox as Alex Faulkner
- Laurence Olivier as Rudolf Hess
- Robert Webber as Robert McCann
- Kenneth Haigh as Colonel Reed-Henry
- Stratford Johns as Mustapha El Ali
- John Terry as Michael Lukas
- Robert Freitag as Karl Stroebling
- Ingrid Pitt as Hooker
- Patrick Stewart as Russian General
- Paul Antrim as RSM. Murphy
- Derek Thompson as Patrick Hourigan
- Michael N. Harbour as Ilya
- David Lumsden as Joseph Koury
- Frederick Warder as Jamil Koury
- Malcolm Jamieson as Pierre Helou
- Billy Boyle as Devenish

== Production ==
The original film The Wild Geese had not been particularly popular in the US but performed better around the world. In April 1984, Richard Burton and Scott Glenn were announced as stars. Roger Moore was asked to reprise his role of Shawn Fynn from the first film but did not like the sequel's script. Lewis Collins claimed he was originally signed to play John Haddad due to a contract with producer Euan Lloyd but the role went to the American Scott Glenn. Ingrid Pitt had previously appeared in Lloyd's Who Dares Wins.

Burton said that after making the film, he intended "to retire again for at least six months". In August 1984, a week before filming was to begin, Burton died of an intracerebral hemorrhage at his home in Geneva. Producer Euan Lloyd had just visited him: "He looked tan and healthy and had just passed his physical examination for the film after a nice holiday in Switzerland". Burton was replaced by Edward Fox.

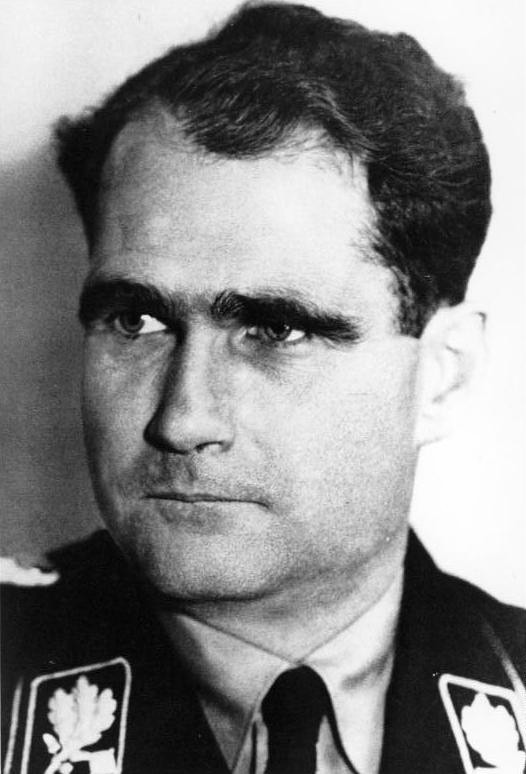
Hess (1933)

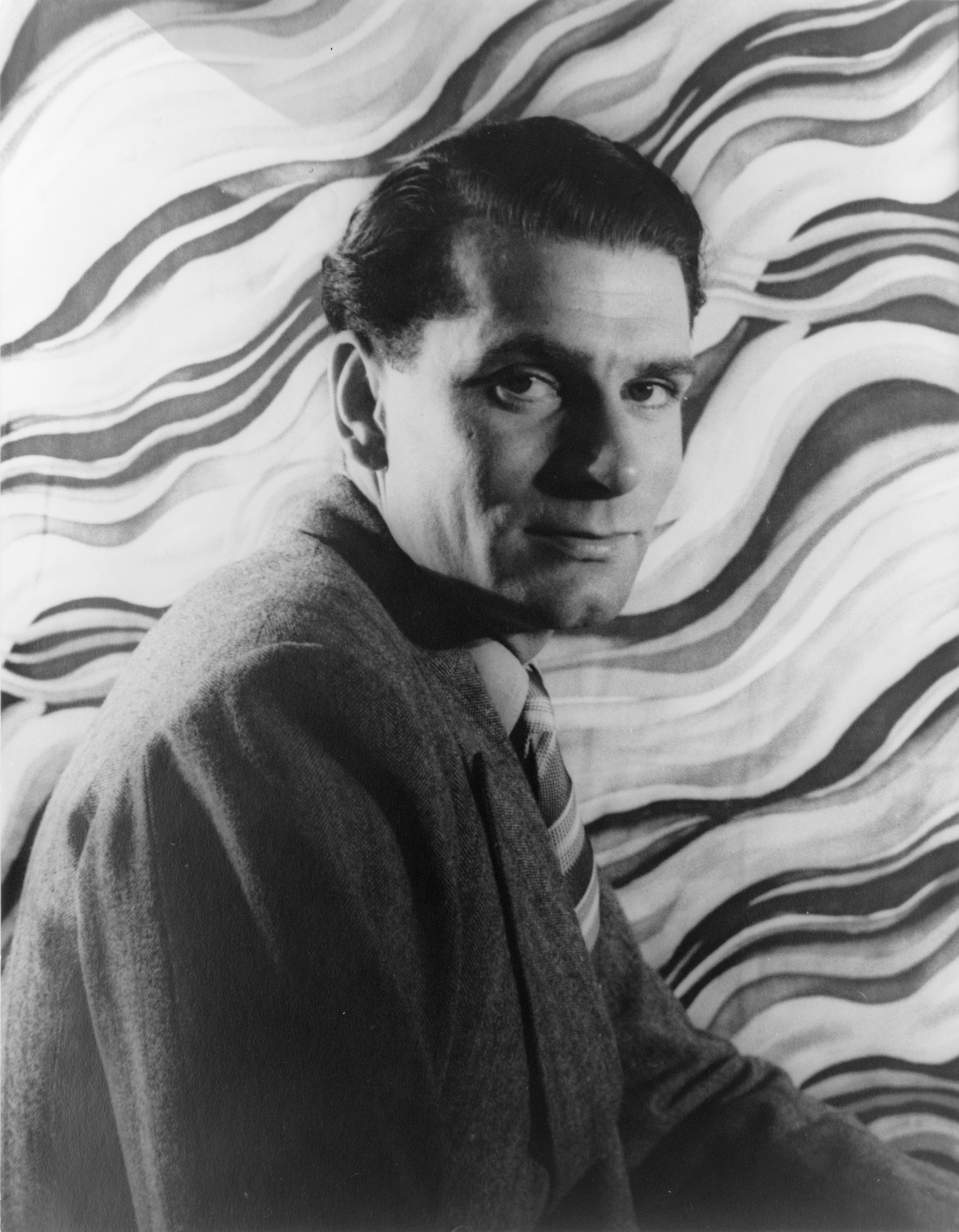
Olivier (1938)

In some ways Laurence Olivier resembled Rudolf Hess.

In January 1985, Thorn EMI split the cost of a five-picture, £38 million slate of films they had made, including Dreamchild, A Passage to India, Morons from Outer Space, The Holcroft Covenant and Wild Geese 2.

The film opens with a dedication to Burton, followed by a brief summary of the previous film. Then-77-year-old Laurence Olivier, who portrayed Rudolf Hess, was in poor health during filming, requiring a nurse to accompany him during production. He was also beginning to suffer with memory problems. Edward Fox recalled him labouring for hours on his one long speech. Ingrid Pitt, who acted in the film but did not have any scenes with him, did have dinner with Olivier during the production, and described him as "very old and frail by this time, but very gallant". Hess's son Wolf Rüdiger Hess said afterwards that Olivier's likeness of his father was "uncannily accurate". Patrick Stewart appears in a small role as a Russian general. By his own admission, he only took the role to pay for much-needed home repairs. He felt his appearance was the biggest embarrassment of his career.
