= The Optimist (TV series) =

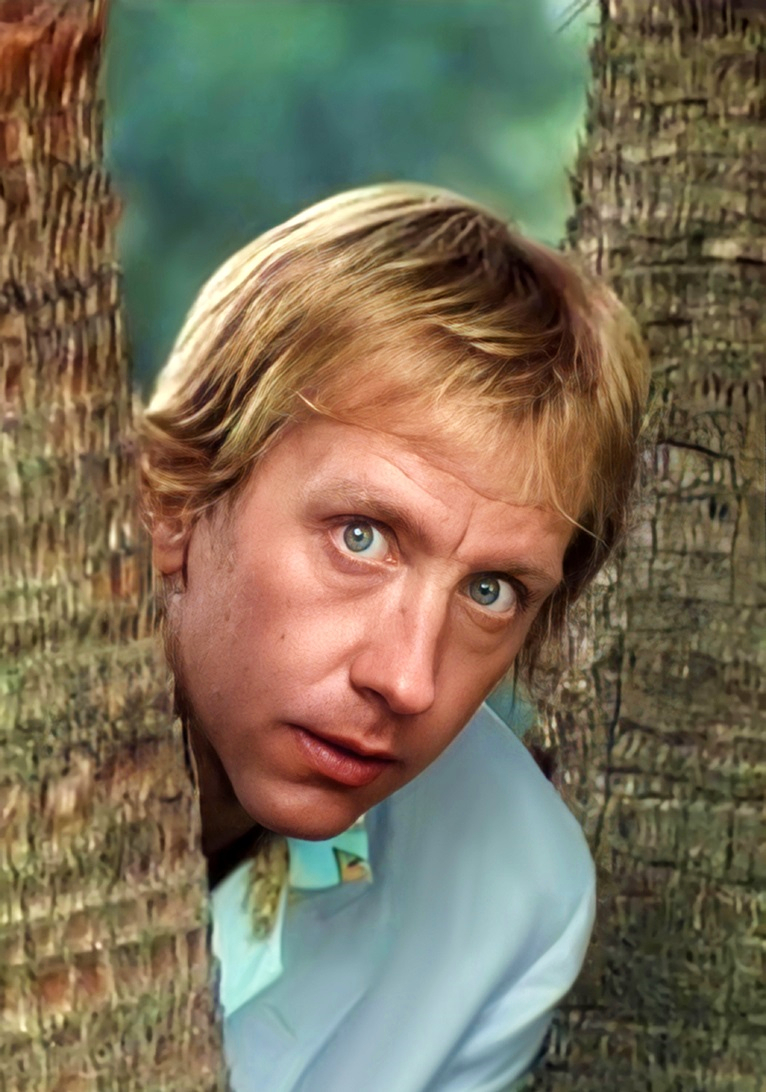
- Enn Reitel as The Optimist
- Genre: Comedy
- Written by: Richard Sparks; Enn Reitel; Robert Fuest; Robert Sidaway; Peter Ellis
- Directed by: Peter Ellis; Robert Fuest
- Starring: Enn Reitel
- Theme music composer: David Spear
- Country of origin: United Kingdom
- Original language: English
- No. of series: 2
- No. of episodes: 13

Production
- Producer: Robert Sidaway
- Running time: 30 minutes
- Production companies: New Century Films; Charisma Films

Original release
- Network: Channel 4
- Release: 14 April 1983 – 5 January 1985

The Optimist is a British television comedy series starring Enn Reitel and produced by Robert Sidaway. Each episode tells a separate comic adventure in the life of an everyday man who, whether it turns out a success or a failure, always remains optimistic. The stories made a feature of fantasy and dream sequences.

Citing the influences of Jacques Tati, Buster Keaton and Charlie Chaplin, as well as the character of Walter Mitty, the series was designed as a silent comedy, with original music and enhanced sound effects. Shooting on 16mm, it was made on location in Cabo San Lucas, Los Angeles and London. Thirteen episodes were produced. Guest stars who featured in the program include Martin Kove, Tracy Scoggins, and Robert Davi.

The series debuted on 14 April 1983 and the final episode was broadcast on 5 January 1985.

== Series ==
=== Series 1 ===
After producer Robert Sidaway raised the finance independently, the pilot, "Sea Dreams", was filmed on location in Cabo San Lucas, Mexico, during summer 1981 with post-production taking place in Los Angeles and London.

After a private screening in Wardour Street, Cecil Korer, Programme Purchaser and Commissioning Editor for Light Entertainment at Channel 4, commissioned a further six episodes.

Each half-hour episode starred Enn Reitel in the title role of The Optimist with the remainder of the cast specific to the requirements of the separate stories. In addition, every episode featured a different British actress as part of the romantic interest.

Filming took place in various locations in Los Angeles during summer 1982 under the direction of Peter Ellis. Director of photography was Peter Appleton, the art director was Mike Porter and the costume designer was Jo Korer.

Composer David Spear wrote and recorded the main theme and extensive score in Los Angeles while the remainder of post-production was completed in London. The editor was John Daniels.

Announced in the press and previewed on Channel 4's opening night (2 November 1982), series one was broadcast on Channel 4 at 8 pm on consecutive Thursdays between 14 April and 26 May 1983.

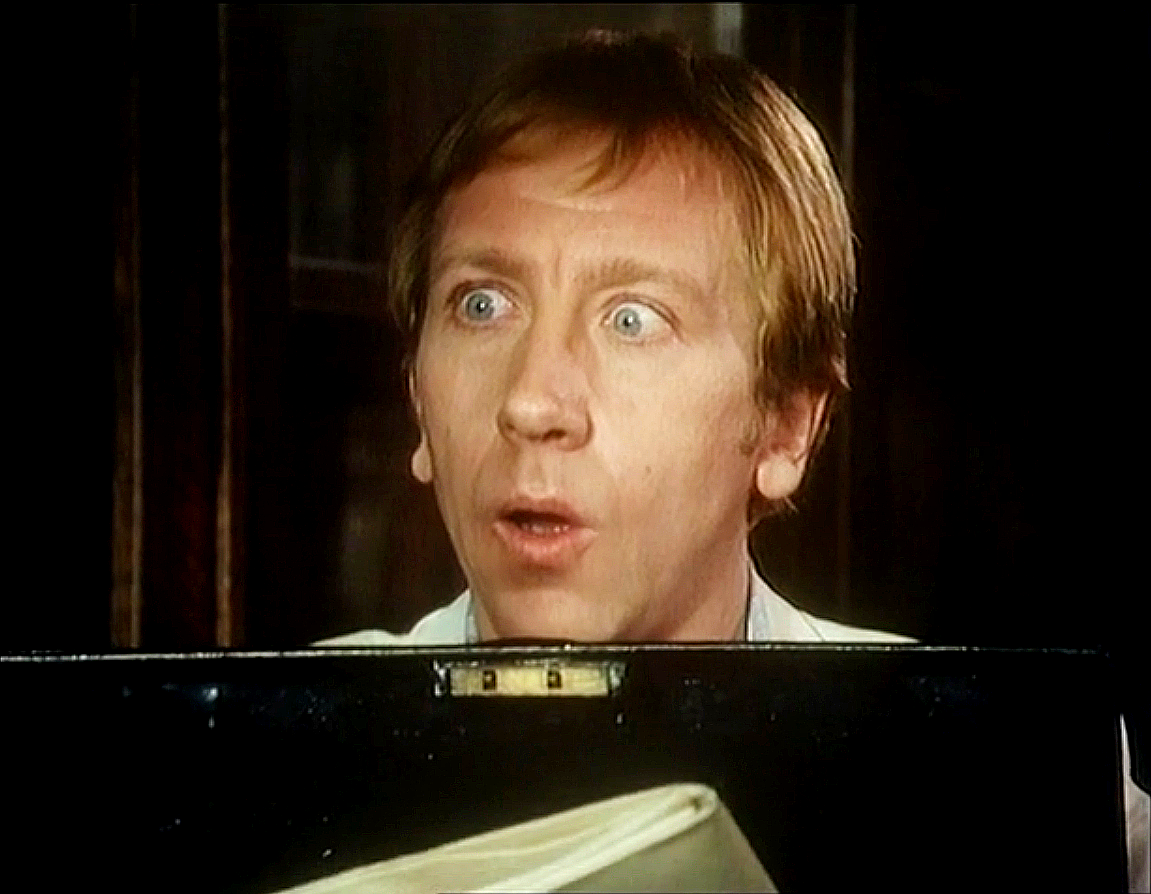
A scene from the episode "The Fool of the House of Esher", which was nominated for the Golden Rose of Montreux.

=== Series 2 ===
Further to the broadcast of series 1, Channel 4 commissioned a second series of six new episodes. The stories were shot on location in London during the summer of 1984 under the direction of Robert Fuest. The new Director of Photography was Francis de Groote, who worked as Assistant Cameraman on the first series, while Mike Porter and Jo Korer repeated their roles as Art Director and Costume Designer respectively.

Utilizing the original main theme, John Cameron joined the production to write the new music scores.

Series 2 was broadcast on Channel 4 at 8 pm on consecutive nights between 31 December 1984 and 5 January 1985.

The episode "The Fool of the House of Esher" was nominated for the Golden Rose of Montreux in 1985.

== Series overview ==
Series	Episodes	Originally released	
Series	Episodes	First released	Last released
1	7	14 April 1983	26 May 1983
2	6	31 December 1984	5 January 1985

== Episodes ==
=== Series 1 (1983) ===
No.	Title	Directed by	Written by	Original release date
1	"Sea Dreams"	Peter Ellis	Richard Sparks	14 April 1983
Falling asleep in his apartment while watching a late-night documentary on windsurfing, The Optimist (Enn Reitel) imagines himself on an exotic beach where he falls in love with The Girl (Sharron Davies) despite his misadventures learning to surf and dancing at the nightclub. To win over The Girl, however, he will need to beat The Rival in a surf race.
2	"The Good, The Bad and the Nasty"	Peter Ellis	Richard Sparks, Peter Ellis, Enn Reitel, Robert Sidaway	21 April 1983
Dressed for the "wild west", The Optimist sets out for a 'Dude Ranch' and is introduced to the riding instructor (Carinthia West), although he finds that a rival (Martin Kove) is already in her favors. Learning to be a cowboy, The Optimist gets lost in the desert, smashes the Rival's car and fantasies that he is Clint Eastwood's 'The Man With No Name' – urged on by a Grizzly Veteran (Bill Erwin) for a shootout with his nemesis.
3	"Man's Worst Friend"	Peter Ellis	Richard Sparks, Peter Ellis, Enn Reitel, Robert Sidaway	28 April 1983
As odd-job man extraordinaire, The Optimist manages to be a tennis pro, a waiter, a golfing coach and a dog minder – all in one day! One morning he is out walking a St Bernard and a toy poodle for a walk in the opulent surroundings of Beverley Hills and manages to lose the poodle while helping out a beautiful Lady Golfer (Tracy Scoggins). He also meets the gorgeous Daughter (Jenifer Landor) of his employer (Ferdy Mayne) and she persuades him not only to play tennis but act as a waiter at the evening's poolside party. Naturally chaos ensues as The Optimist finds himself pursued by both women.
4	"Healthy Bodies, Unhealthy Mind"	Peter Ellis	Peter Ellis, Enn Reitel, Robert Sidaway	5 May 1983
Out jogging, The Optimist realizes that is totally unfit and decides to enroll himself at a health farm, but soon discovers the place is more like a prison run by the scary Matron (Fran Ryan) – half-starved, tortured in the gymnasium and physically battered in an all-ladies aerobic session. Despite this he of course manages to fall in love with the Dancer (Terri Robinson) as well as devises a way to eat and a plan to escape. Helped by the Dancer, a multitude of disguises and the local fire brigade, he heads for freedom, jogging into the sunset with the girl of his dreams.
5	"Kid's Stuff"	Peter Ellis	Richard Sparks, Peter Ellis, Enn Reitel, Robert Sidaway	12 May 1983
Employed by a mother (Patrika Darbo) to babysit her 'perfect' son, The Optimist instead finds the overweight boy is a particularly unpleasant 10-year-old. Keeping him amused is no easy task, although when they visit the local circus The Optimist immediately falls in love with acrobatic Circus Girl (Christine Garner) and faces an adversary in strongman The Bull. Forced into performing with the acrobats and clowns and on the high trapeze, he ends up being fired from a cannon by the cunning boy.
6	"Burning Rubber"	Peter Ellis	Richard Sparks, Peter Ellis, Enn Reitel, Robert Sidaway	19 May 1983
Roller-skating through Venice Beach, The Optimist runs into a lady racing driver (Dinah May). After helping mend her bust tire, he follows the Girl to the racing circuit, where he becomes a mechanic and soon afterwards finds himself one of the drivers. Suddenly it's Grand Prix time and the race is on – his prize, the Girl of course! His competition is a bad-tempered Cabbie (Robert Davi). Miraculously he wins, but fame and fortune are brief – he needs to make a quick getaway before anyone finds out his true identity.
7	"A Challenge"	Peter Ellis	Peter Ellis, Enn Reitel, Robert Sidaway	26 May 1983
After meeting a stunning girl (Jadie Rivas) in Marina Del Rey, The Optimist finds himself in competition with a Rival (Richard Booker) for her affections – first in a surfing competition and then in a duel which starts on Santa Monica Beach but takes them on a continuous battle throughout Los Angeles, including a car wash, across Wilshire Boulevard, outside the Hollywood High School and even hanging off the Hollywood Sign.

=== Series 2 (1984–85) ===
No.	Title	Directed by	Written by	Original release date
1	"Any Messages"	Robert Fuest	Robert Fuest, Enn Reitel	31 December 1984
As chief sprayer of green fly to both the Chinese and Indian Embassies, The Optimist is forcibly persuaded to smuggles messages into the Russian and American Embassies via roller towels. MI5 then persuades him to become a double agent and steal top secrets from the Russians. Amidst the mayhem of a poisoned cocktail party, he pulls off the job with the help of a bewitching Agent (Annette Lynton) only to end up in a Chinese restaurant being persuaded by money, and more to the point a meat cleaver, to work once more for his oriental friend (Anthony Chinn).
2	"Turf Luck"	Robert Fuest	Robert Fuest, Enn Reitel	1 January 1985
The Optimist goes racing, meets the lovely Sal (Julia Chambers) and becomes a stable boy. He saves the aptly named horse Nutter from being sent to the knackers yard and lovingly prepares him for the big race. Betting spies are afoot and the stakes are high as the big day arrives, with Nutter the big favorite. Unfortunately, Nutter loves his savior so much that during the race he suddenly stops to go over and say hello to The Optimist and give him a nuzzle.
3	"The Light Fantastic"	Robert Fuest	Robert Fuest, Enn Reitel	2 January 1985
Working as a humble cobbler, The Optimist is thrown into an international world of crime and classical ballet when a diamond is stolen – the famous Light Fantastic. Olga (Karen Smith) is on the run from incompetent Thugs (one of them Ian McNeice) when she hides the stone in her ballet shoe and draws The Optimist into a convoluted plot that leads to him on stage dancing the pas-de-deux in Tchaikovsky's Swan Lake. By the end he finds himself alone in the theater – unknowingly still in possession of the fabulous diamond.
4	"The Double"	Robert Fuest	Robert Fuest, Enn Reitel	3 January 1985
On his arrival at a plush London casino, The Optimist discovers that he has become an instant celebrity. What he doesn't know is that he is actually the identical double of the Boss (Enn Reitel) who owns the club. After loving and losing his double's girlfriend (Jenny Runacre), and winning and losing a million pounds on the tables, The Optimist has to work out how to make a safe escape.
5	"The Fool of the House of Esher"	Robert Fuest	Robert Fuest, Enn Reitel	4 January 1985
An unexpected inheritance leaves The Optimist with a crumbling and sinister country estate, which includes an equally crumbling and sinister butler named Old Norman (Eric Francis). He spends his time trying to win the respect of his landed gentry neighbors as well as avoiding the murderous attempts of his cousin Rachel (Rosalind Lloyd) – who is not happy that she did not benefit from the will and is determined to put it right.
6	"The Brush Off"	Robert Fuest	Robert Fuest, Enn Reitel	5 January 1985
After unintentionally whitewashing the walls and then the entire garden of a suburban home, The Optimist is mistaken for a new impressionist painter. His absurd abstracts sell for thousands and the art world flocks to his new master of the brush. When his artistic muse Mimi (Julie Peasgood) suddenly leaves him, he is left in despair and attempts to paint his masterpiece – but unveiled at an exhibition it is proclaimed a complete and total disaster. Back on the streets as a laborer, The Optimist unwittingly paints a true masterpiece.

== DVD & streaming releases ==
A 2-disc set containing all 13 episodes was released on DVD by Kaleidoscope in 2023. The set includes scripts from the first series, and an unbroadcast version of the pilot episode. The program is also featured on the Tubi, Roku and Plex streaming platforms. In May 2024 The Optimist was announced as part of the launch schedule of the UK television channel Rewind TV. Reitel speaks about his role in The Optimist in the Rewind TV program An Hour with Enn Reitel, first broadcast in December 2024.

== Gallery ==
Christine Garner, Terri Robinson, Dinah May and Carinthia West on location in Los Angeles, July 1982, for the shoot of The Optimist, series one

Enn Reitel on location in Los Angeles, July 1982, on the shoot of The Optimist, series one (episode 5, "Kid's Stuff")

Enn Reitel on location in Los Angeles, August 1982, on the shoot of The Optimist, series one (episode 4, "Healthy Body, Unhealthy Mind")

Tracy Scoggins on location in Los Angeles, July 1982, on the shoot of The Optimist, series one (episode 3, "Man's Worst Friend")

Annette Lynton and Enn Reitel in August 1984 on the London shoot of The Optimist, series two (episode 1, "Any Messages")

Karen Smith and Enn Reitel in August 1984 on the London shoot of The Optimist, series two (episode 5, "The Light Fantastic")

Enn Reitel and Rosalind Lloyd in September 1984 on the London shoot of The Optimist, series two (episode 5, "The Fool of the House of Esher")

Julie Peasgood and Enn Reitel in September 1984 on the London shoot of The Optimist, series two (episode 6, "The Brush Off")
