= The Wild Geese =

1978 film by Andrew V. McLaglen

- Original poster by Arnaldo Putzu
- Directed by: Andrew V. McLaglen
- Screenplay by: Reginald Rose
- Based on: The Wild Geese (1978 novel) by Daniel Carney
- Produced by: Euan Lloyd
- Starring: Richard Burton; Roger Moore; Richard Harris; Hardy Krüger; Jeff Corey; Frank Finlay; Barry Foster; Ronald Fraser; Kenneth Griffith; John Kani; David Ladd; Rosalind Lloyd; Winston Ntshona; Jack Watson; Stewart Granger
- Cinematography: Jack Hildyard
- Edited by: John Glen
- Music by: Roy Budd
- Production companies: Richmond Film Productions (West) Ltd; Varius Entertainment Trading A.G.
- Distributed by: Rank Film Distributors (United Kingdom)
- Release dates: 28 June 1978 (South Africa); 6 July 1978 (Royal Film Performance); 17 September 1978 (United Kingdom)
- Running time: 134 minutes
- Country: United Kingdom
- Language: English
- Budget: $11.6 million

The Wild Geese is a 1978 British war action film directed by Andrew V. McLaglen, and starring Richard Burton, Roger Moore, Richard Harris and Hardy Krüger as a British mercenary unit in Sub-Saharan Africa. The screenplay by Reginald Rose was based on Daniel Carney's then-unpublished novel The Thin White Line. Carney's novel was subsequently published under the film's title to coincide with its release.

The film was the result of a long-held ambition of producer Euan Lloyd to make an all-star adventure film in the vein of The Guns of Navarone or Where Eagles Dare. The title is named after the Wild Goose flag and shoulder patch used by Michael "Mad Mike" Hoare's Five Commando, ANC, which in turn was inspired by the Flight of the Wild Geese. The novel and film was based upon rumours and speculation following the 1968 landing of a mysterious aeroplane in Rhodesia that was said to have been loaded with mercenaries and "an African president" believed to have been a dying Moïse Tshombe. Hoare was the film’s technical advisor and real members of Five Commando appear in the film.

The film had a Royal premiere in London on 6 July 1978, and was released in the United Kingdom on 17 September by Rank Film Distributors. The Wild Geese received mixed reviews from critics, and was a commercial success. A sequel, Wild Geese II, was released in 1985.

== Plot ==
Colonel Allen Faulkner, a former British Army officer turned mercenary, meets with merchant banker Sir Edward Matherson in London. Matherson proposes the rescue of President Julius Limbani, the deposed leader of a southern African nation due for execution by General Ndofa. Limbani is held in a remote prison in Zembala, guarded by a regiment of General Ndofa's troops nicknamed the "Simbas".

Faulkner accepts the offer and begins recruiting mercenaries from his network of friends and colleagues, starting with Captain Rafer Janders, a skilled tactician and single father. They work with Matherson to save former Irish Guards lieutenant and pilot-turned-smuggler Shawn Fynn from American Mafia baron Mr. Martin. Faulkner recruits Sandy Young to act as sergeant-major and Fynn brings in Pieter Coetzee, formerly of the South African Defence Force (SADF), who plans to buy a farm with his earnings. The force of fifty mercenaries train in Swaziland under the harsh direction of Young. Faulkner promises to watch over Janders' only son Emile should he not survive.

Faulkner is forced to launch the mission with only a day's notice. The group parachute into Zembala by a HALO jump on Christmas Day. One group rescues the ailing Limbani from a heavily guarded prison while another seizes a small airfield to await extraction. Meanwhile, Matherson cancels their flight unexpectedly, having secured copper mining assets from General Ndofa in exchange for Limbani. Stranded deep in hostile territory, the mercenaries are killed, including Coetzee, as they fight their way through bush country pursued by the Simbas.

The mercenaries make their way to Limbani's home village, hoping to start a rebellion, but find the people too ill-equipped to fight. Father Geoghegen, an Irish missionary, informs the group of a Douglas Dakota transport aircraft they can escape in. The mercenaries suffer massive casualties holding the Simbas off in a climactic battle while Fynn starts the Dakota's engines. Janders is shot in the leg, preventing him from boarding the departing plane and Faulkner kills him to spare him from capture and torture. The thirteen surviving mercenaries land at Kariba Airport in Rhodesia but Limbani dies from a gunshot wound sustained during the escape, ultimately rendering the entire mission a failure.

Months later, Faulkner returns to London, having had various contracts put out on him by Matherson. With Fynn's help, he breaks into Matherson's home and confronts him. Faulkner takes the half a million dollars in Matherson's safe to compensate the survivors and the families of those killed in Zembala. Matherson tries to bribe Faulkner to spare his life but Faulkner kills him and escapes with Fynn. Faulkner fulfils his promise to Janders by visiting Emile at his boarding school.

== Cast ==
- Richard Burton as Colonel Allen Faulkner
- Roger Moore as Lieutenant Shawn Fynn
- Richard Harris as Captain Rafer Janders
- Hardy Krüger as Lieutenant Pieter Coetzee
- Stewart Granger as Sir Edward Matherson
- Jack Watson as Regimental Sergeant Major Sandy Young
- Frank Finlay as Father Geoghegen
- Kenneth Griffith as Medic Arthur Witty
- Winston Ntshona as President Julius Limbani
- John Kani as Sergeant Jesse Blake
- Jeff Corey as Mr. Martin
- Barry Foster as Thomas Balfour
- Ronald Fraser as Sergeant Jock McTaggart
- Ian Yule as Sergeant Tosh Donaldson
- David Ladd as Sonny Martinelli
- Patrick Allen as Rushton
- Brook Williams as Samuels
- Percy Herbert as Keith
- Rosalind Lloyd as Heather Courtney
- Jane Hylton as Marjorie Young
- Paul Spurrier as Emile Janders
- Ken Gampu as Alexander
- Glyn Baker as Esposito
- Patrick Holt as Skyjacker
- Terence Longdon as Anonymous Man
- Valerie Leon as Dealer
- Anna Bergman as Sonny's Girlfriend

== Production ==
=== Development ===
The film was based on the then-unpublished Daniel Carney novel The Thin White Line, which Euan Lloyd read prior to publication. He optioned it and hired Reginald Rose to write the screenplay in June 1976. The budget was US$9 million. United Artists was enthusiastic about the film but insisted Lloyd give the director's job to Michael Winner. Lloyd refused and instead chose Andrew V. McLaglen, son of Victor McLaglen, a British-born American previously known mainly for making westerns. Lloyd had a friendship with John Ford, whom McLaglen remembered as having recommended him to direct the film. This would have been impossible as Ford died in 1973, years before the novel on which the film was based came into existence. The finance for the film was raised partly by pre-selling it to distributors based on the script and the names of the stars who were set to appear.

The African nation in the film is not named, but it is clearly meant to be Zaire (the modern Democratic Republic of the Congo). The film's promotional literature made the link clear as The Wild Geese was promoted at the time as the story of "50 steelhard mercs who undertake a terrifying mission in dangerous, sweltering Central Africa-very much like the Old Congo-to rescue and bring out a deposed and imprisoned black president". The film's villain, General Ndofa, described in the film as an extremely corrupt and brutal leader of a copper-rich nation in central Africa, was a thinly disguised version of President Mobutu Sese Seko. Likewise, the character of Julius Limbani (Winston Ntshona), the deposed pro-Western leader who was imprisoned following the hijacking of an airliner, was based upon Moïse Tshombe. Finally, the film's hero, Colonel Allen Faulkner (Richard Burton), described as a British mercenary living in South Africa, was based on Colonel Michael "Mad Mike" Hoare. Like Faulkner, Hoare was a former British Army officer living in South Africa who worked as a mercenary and had been hired to fight for the Tshombe government in the Congo in 1964-1965. Hoare served as the film's "military and technical adviser" and very much approved of the film, which he praised as a realistic depiction of the mercenary sub-culture. Part of the finance came from The Rank Organisation.

=== Casting ===
Although Lloyd had both Richard Burton and Roger Moore in mind for their respective roles from a relatively early stage, other casting decisions were more difficult. As the mercenaries were mostly composed of military veterans (some of whom had fought under Faulkner's command before), it was necessary to cast a number of older actors and extras into these physically demanding roles. A number of veterans and actual mercenary soldiers appeared in the film.

Northern Irish actor Stephen Boyd, a close friend of Lloyd's, was originally set to star as Sandy Young, the sergeant major who trains the mercenaries before their mission. However, Boyd died shortly before filming commenced and Jack Watson was chosen as a late replacement. He had previously played a similar role in McLaglen's 1968 film The Devil's Brigade. Lloyd had offered the part of the banker Edward Matherson to his friend Joseph Cotten but scheduling difficulties meant that he also had to be replaced, this time by Stewart Granger.

Burt Lancaster originally hoped to play the part of Rafer Janders, who in Carney's book was an American living in London. Lancaster wanted the part substantially altered and enlarged. The producers declined and in his place chose Richard Harris. Lloyd initially had reservations about casting Harris because of his wild reputation – he was blamed for Golden Rendezvous going over budget by $1.5 million due to his drinking and rewriting the script. The insurers only agreed to Harris' casting if Lloyd put up his entire salary as guarantee, Harris put up half of his $600,000 fee, and that the producer would sign a declaration at the end of every day saying Harris had not held up filming due to drinking, misbehaving or rewriting lines. According to Lloyd: "I'd already made enquiries about the hold ups on Golden Rendezvous. I discovered the blame was not entirely Richard's. So, as I wanted him for the part, I took the gamble. And it was a gamble. If he'd misbehaved and he'd started losing days it would have come out of my pocket". Harris did not know about the arrangement until the end of the shoot.

Hardy Krüger was not the first actor considered for the role of Pieter Coetzee. Lloyd originally thought of Curd Jürgens, but felt that Hardy seemed to fit. Krüger was also impressed by the script scenes played with Limbani. Moore later quipped that "I was the only wild member of the cast. Harris and Burton were on the wagon and Krüger never emerged from his room with his lady". Moore's character was nearly offered to O. J. Simpson after confusion on the American financier's part regarding the character being described as black Irish. To Lloyd's surprise, Moore told him to cut his character's number of lines because he had no intention of trying to out-perform either Burton or Harris; the character retained his core expositions but became more of a stoic action figure in the final production.

Lloyd hesitated before offering the role of Arthur Witty, the gay medic, to his longtime friend Kenneth Griffith. When finally approached, Griffith said "Some of my dearest friends in the world are homosexuals!" and accepted the part. Percy Herbert, who played the role of Keith, was a veteran of World War II, in which he had been wounded in the defence of Singapore, then captured by the Imperial Japanese Army and interned in a POW camp.

Alan Ladd's son David Ladd and Stanley Baker's son Glyn Baker also had roles in the film. Ladd played Sonny Martinelli, the drug-dealing nephew of London-based mob boss Mr. Martin (Jeff Corey) and Baker played the young mercenary Esposito. With the cast made up from so many veteran actors, Baker claimed that the only reason he stayed alive in the plot so long was that he was one of the few actors young and fit enough to carry President Limbani for any period of time. Sonny's girlfriend in the film was played by Anna Bergman, the daughter of Ingmar Bergman.

Ian Yule, who played Tosh Donaldson, had been a real mercenary in Africa in the 1960s and 1970s. He was cast locally in South Africa. He then brought his former commanding officer, Michael "Mad Mike" Hoare, who had led one legion of mercenaries, 5 Commando, Armée Nationale Congolaise (not to be confused with 5 Commando, the Second World War British Commando force), in the Congo Crisis of the 1960s, to be the technical adviser for the film, a role which he shared with Yule.

John Kani played Jesse Blake, a mercenary who had previously served with Faulkner and was struggling to live before the chance to work with Faulkner again. Palitoy based the action figure Tom Stone (part of the Action Man team) on the character Blake after looking at the pre-production photos and posters of the film. Subsequently, some modifications to the figure were made. Kani made his debut in the film after years of acting and stage performances with Winston Ntshona. Ntshona was cast as Limbani in the film and continued to make many more films with Kani after The Wild Geese.

Kani and Ntshona say they both turned down roles in the film at first after hearing it would be about mercenaries, only to change their mind after reading the script. As Kani commented: "The film could not come at a better time. We know exactly what is happening in Africa today and a movie that devotes – out of 120 minutes – even three quarters of a minute to say we need each other and to say that a white man can be just as much an African as a black man, that's important". Rosalind Lloyd, who played Heather Courtney, is Euan Lloyd's daughter. Her mother, actress Jane Hylton, played Mrs. Young.

=== Filming ===
Principal filming took place in South Africa in the summer and autumn of 1977, with additional studio filming at Twickenham Film Studios in Middlesex. Roger Moore estimated location filming in Africa took about three months with the unit taking over a health spa near Tshipise in Northern Transvaal (now Limpopo); shooting also took place at Messina Border Region. The fictional country is said to lie on the border with Burundi, Rhodesia and Rwanda and Zambia, Uganda and Swaziland are also mentioned to be close by.

The rugby scenes were filmed over a period of two days at Marble Hill Park in Twickenham with extras drafted in from nearby Teddington Boys' School. Marble Hill Close near Marble Hill Park was also used as a location. Most of the military equipment used in the film came from the South African Army but some special weaponry needed to be imported from Britain, as Lloyd commented: "Even though the stuff couldn't fire real bullets, it was held up for weeks by the British government because it was going to South Africa". South Africa was subjected to a mandatory arms embargo imposed by the United Nations Security Council Resolution 418 in 1977.

== Soundtrack ==
The music by Roy Budd originally included an overture and end title music, but both of these were replaced by "Flight of the Wild Geese", written and performed by Joan Armatrading. All three pieces are included on the soundtrack album, as well as the song "Dogs of War" that featured lyrics sung by the Scots Guards to Budd's themes. Budd used Alexander Borodin's String Quartet No. 2 as a theme for Janders. The soundtrack was originally released by A&M Records then later released under licence as a Cinephile DVD, as well as a limited pressing in 1988 by Varèse Sarabande.

== Release ==
The Wild Geese enjoyed a Royal premiere in support of Scope, with most of the stars of the film present along with John Mills. The film was a considerable commercial success in Britain and other countries worldwide. It was one of the most popular movies of 1978 at the British box office with distributors gross of £495,633.

Although it grossed $3,630,250 in its first 10 days of release in the United States and Canada from 550 theatres, the film was only partially distributed in the United States because of the collapse of its American distributor Allied Artists and the movie lacking a marketable American star. It went on to earn theatrical rentals of $3.5 million there. It was also popular in Germany, receiving the Goldene Leinwand for having over 3 million admissions.

== Reception ==
On the review aggregator Rotten Tomatoes, the film holds a 70% approval rating from 10 critics. The film also won a Golden Screen Award. In a negative review, it was chosen as "Dog of the Year" by film critic Gene Siskel, who accused the film of being "deadly dull" and claimed that it "exploits racism as some kind of sporting entertainment".

The production was the subject of controversy because of its portrayal of black characters and the decision to film in South Africa during apartheid. Anti-apartheid campaigners protested at the film's London premiere. Warned of the protest, producer Lloyd brought copies of newspaper articles describing the film's premiere in the black township of Soweto, where it had been received with enthusiasm and approval. In Ireland, the Irish Anti-Apartheid Movement protested outside cinemas that showed the film.

In a later interview, actor Hardy Krüger complained about how his character was portrayed in the film:

For this kind of a delicate story in Africa with an element of battle in it, there has to be some shoot-out. But Euan Lloyd, a man I respect very much, chose to hire Andrew McLaglen who's basically a director of westerns. He brought this element into The Wild Geese that didn't really belong there – the shoot 'em up cowboy kind of thing. It overwhelmed the basic theme. There are certain directors, and Andrew is one, who, when it comes to the editing, always puts a moment in the film when somebody talks. I'm a listener as an actor – a reactor – and it was very important to me to listen. I played the whole part like that: I'm listening to this black man on my shoulder, and it's by listening that I'm beginning to understand that I'm the dumb Boer and he's the intelligent man who we all need. So Andrew butchered my performance by not understanding that you can play a part by listening. My character didn't really come out, because you didn't see the transformation. I don't know why Euan allowed him to do it.

== Sequel ==
Euan Lloyd produced a sequel, Wild Geese II (1985), based on the novel The Square Circle (later republished as Wild Geese II), also by Daniel Carney. Burton was planning to reprise his role as Colonel Allen Faulkner, but he died days before filming began. Roger Moore had also considered reprising his role in the sequel but declined. In the sequel, Edward Fox played Allen Faulkner's brother Alex Faulkner, who is hired to break Nazi war criminal Rudolf Hess (Laurence Olivier) out of Spandau Prison so he can appear for a media interview.

== Proposed remake ==
Producer Gianni Nunnari had first bought the rights to remake through his company Hollywood Gang Productions in 2007. Rupert Sanders was attached to direct. In August 2017, New Republic Pictures and Filmula attempted to produce a remake of the film with William Monahan writing the screenplay. By November 2021, the film was revealed to still be in development.

== See also ==
- The Sea Wolves
- The Dogs of War
- The Expendables

== Books ==
- Burke, Kyle (2018). Revolutionaries for the Right Anticommunist Internationalism and Paramilitary Warfare in the Cold War. Chapel Hill: University of North Carolina Press. ISBN 9781469640747.
