= Rosalind Lloyd =

British film and television actress (born 1953)

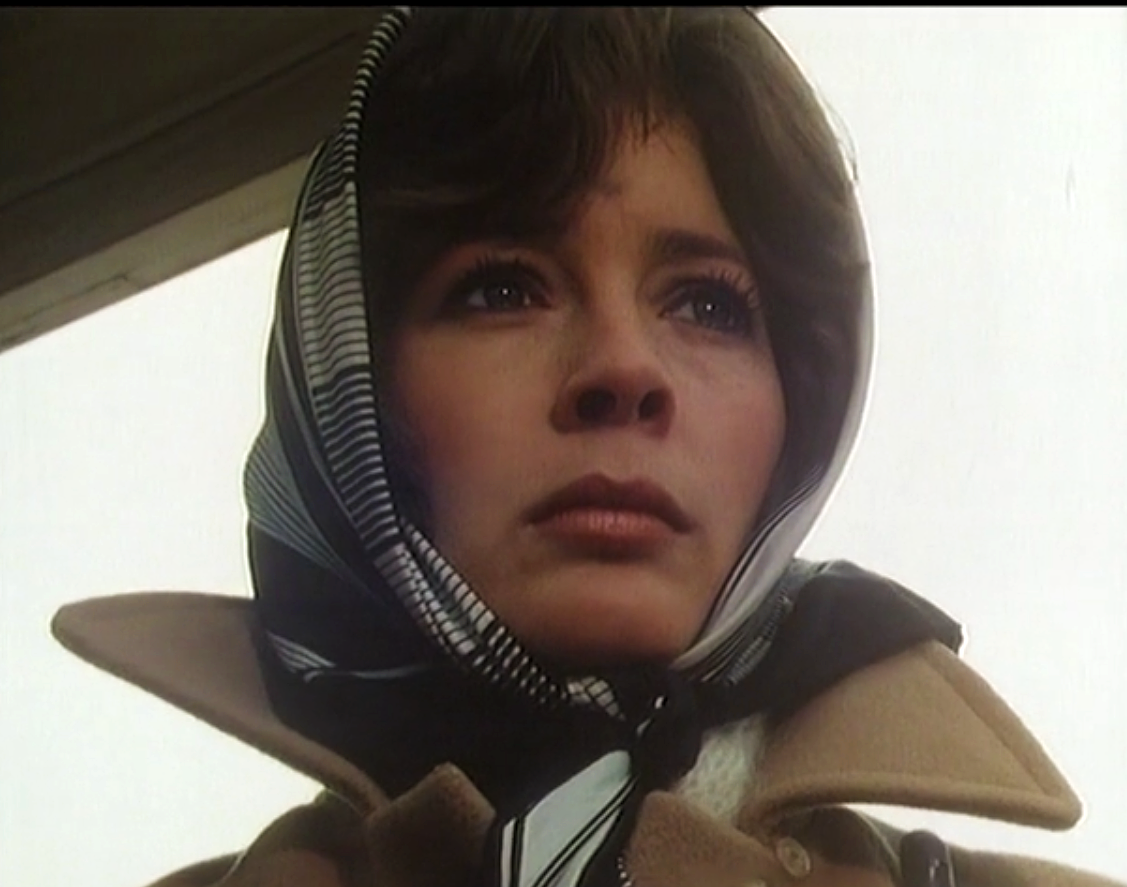
- Lloyd in The Optimist, 1984
- Born: 25 March 1953 (age 72); Marylebone, London, England
- Occupation: Actress
- Years active: 1970–1985
- Relatives: Jane Hylton (mother); Euan Lloyd (father)

Rosalind Lloyd (born 25 March 1953) is a British film and television actress. She is the daughter of film producer Euan Lloyd and actress Jane Hylton.

Her film credits include:The Rivals, The Wild Geese (1978), Inseminoid (1981) and Who Dares Wins (1982). Her television appearances include: The Rivals of Sherlock Holmes, (as Lucy), Doctor Who (in the serial The Pirate Planet), Within These Walls, and Only Fools and Horses in the 1982 Christmas Special "Diamonds Are for Heather", Minder and Bergerac. She appeared as Rachel in The Optimist episode 'The Fool of the House of Esher', which was nominated for the Golden Rose of Montreux award of 1985.

== Filmography ==
=== Film ===
| Year | Title | Role | Notes |
|---|---|---|---|
| 1978 | The Wild Geese | Heather | |
| 1981 | Inseminoid | Gail | |
| 1982 | Who Dares Wins | Jenny Skellen | |

=== Television ===
| Year | Title | Role | Notes |
|---|---|---|---|
| 1970 | Menace | Cheryl | Episode: "The Straight and the Narrow" |
| 1971 | The Ten Commandments | Amanda | Episode: "The Catherine Wheel" |
| 1971 | The Rivals of Sherlock Holmes | Lucy | Episode: "The Woman in the Big Hat" |
| 1971 | Wives and Daughters | Cynthia Kirkpatrick | 4 episodes |
| 1972 | Spyder's Web | Nelli | Episode: "Life at a Price" |
| 1972 | Crime of Passion | Vera Cadoux | Episode: "Baptiste" |
| 1972 | ITV Sunday Night Theatre | the American girl | Episode: "Sharing the Honours" |
| 1972 | The Edwardians | Violet Punt | Episode: "Mr Rolls and Mr Royce" |
| 1973 | Armchair 30 | Zena | Episode: "Alan's Story" |
| 1974 | Within These Walls | Sally | Episode: "The Walls Came Tumbling Down" |
| 1974 | Centre Play | Natalie | Episode: "Sweetheart" |
| 1978 | Doctor Who | Nurse | 3 episodes; The Pirate Planet |
| 1980 | A Question of Guilt | Elizabeth Gough | 8 episodes |
| 1981 | The Walls of Jericho | Elizabeth Garrett-Anderson | 3 episodes |
| 1981 | Maybury | Janet Anderson | Episode: "Indoor Games" |
| 1982 | Only Fools and Horses | Heather | Episode: "Diamonds Are for Heather" |
| 1983 | Spooky | Mother | Episode: "The Exorcism of Amy" |
| 1984 | Bergerac | Sally Campion | Episode: "A Cry in the Night" |
| 1984 | Minder | Fenella | Episode: "Sorry Pal, Wrong Number" |
| 1985 | The Optimist | Rachel | Episode: "The Fool of the House of Esher" |
