= The Wild Geese (Carney novel) =

1978 novel by Daniel Carney

- Paperback edition
- Author: Daniel Carney
- Working title: The Thin White Line
- Language: English
- Subject: Mercenaries in Africa
- Publisher: Bantam Books
- Publication date: 28 November 1978
- Publication place: Rhodesia (now Zimbabwe)
- Media type: Print
- Pages: 450 pp.
- ISBN: 0-552-10869-3
- OCLC: 154106136
- Followed by: The Square Circle

The Wild Geese is a 1978 novel by Rhodesian author Daniel Carney published by Bantam Books. He originally titled it The Thin White Line, but it went unpublished until its film adaptation The Wild Geese was made.

Carney could not get his novel published until a chance meeting with film producer Euan Lloyd. Lloyd loved the story about mercenaries in Africa on a mission to rescue a deposed leader, and purchased the rights to adapt it into a film. Carney in return asked for his novel to be published and Lloyd agreed, as he had already had an offer from an American publisher when he had first taken the novel to Hollywood. The novel was finally published as The Wild Geese just before the film's release.

== The story ==
=== May 1968 ===
Deposed Congolese President Julius Limbani is on a flight to Israel when his bodyguard is murdered. The CIA have hijacked the plane as part of a Cold War deal with current Congo president General Ndofa. Waiting in the Tel Aviv airport for Limbani is an Anglo-South African mercenary soldier Colonel Allen Faulkner. Faulkner is under contract to take Limbani back to the Congo and mount a coup d'état. When Limbani fails to arrive, Faulkner is left unemployed and returns to South Africa.

=== November 1970 ===
Over two years have passed and Faulkner is summoned to London by merchant banker Sir Edward Matherson. Faulkner learns that not only is Limbani alive but he is held in Algeria and is to be returned to the Congo for execution. Matherson proposes for Faulkner to raise and lead a mercenary unit to rescue Limbani and bring him to London. With this chance to redeem his tarnished reputation after Limbani was kidnapped under his contracted safety, Faulkner agrees and sets about assembling his team. Three men are top of Faulkner's list; all have served under him in the past and are trusted beyond question. First to be recruited is American Rafer Janders, who at that time is in hiding from the Mafia. They have put out a contract on Janders' life after he killed a local mafioso's nephew for tricking Janders into being a courier of heroin. As Matherson persuades the Mafia into lifting the contract, Faulkner finds Janders holed up above a night club for homosexuals. Whilst waiting for Matherson to deal with the Mafia, Faulkner learns about what has happened to Janders since they last served together seven years ago. With Janders now part of the operation, Faulkner turns to two more comrades from the Congo, Lieutenant Jeremy Chandos and Regimental Sergeant Major Sandy Young.

After recruiting two more officers (Fynn and Coetzee) and 45 NCOs and enlisted men, the group travels to Portuguese-ruled Mozambique for training. Once Young begins training, he quickly becomes resented by most of the men because of his rigid and harsh methods. While Faulkner remains popular with the men, it is not the same for the RSM, who easily defeats an attempt by a few disgruntled mercenaries to kill him. Now respected as well as disliked by the men, RSM Young transforms old, seasoned soldiers and young rookies into a formidable fighting force. As Faulkner and Janders procure their transport and weapons, Chandos, Fynn and Coetzee explore the local nightlife of Lourenço Marques. There Fynn and Chandos meet two local escort girls; Jeremy dates Maria. Shawn dates Gabriella, who is nicknamed Gabby, and finds himself once again with a reason not to go on the mission. Fynn eventually recognises that he has a responsibility to his comrades and flies out with the rest of the mercenaries. However Fynn makes a promise to Gabby that he will return to her when he gets back.

A C-130 belonging to Mad Malloy takes them to their drop zone in the hills surrounding Albertville. The jump goes well except for Fynn, whose parachute fails to deploy properly but manages to land safely after using his reserve chute. Faulkner gathers his men, then the group splits in two and each march on their respective objective. As Chandos and Fynn's group approach the local airport, Faulkner's group manage to find the army barracks after an unexpected delay. The barracks which hold a garrison of the Congolese national army (ANC) as well as the imprisoned Limbani, cannot be approached easily, as there is no cover for a hundred metres. To take out the three sentries, Coetzee shoots them with crossbow armed with cyanide-tipped bolts. The mercenaries enter the barracks quickly and quietly as most of the garrison is asleep; it is now they split into three further groups. As Young leads one team to destroy the armoury, Janders' group enters the dormitories and, wearing gas masks, proceeds to kill the sleeping soldiers with cyanide gas. While these two groups get on with their tasks, Faulkner's group burst in on the guard-house under cover of the mercenaries' guns. Coetzee relieves one of the Congolese officers of the keys to the cells located beneath the room and along with a Scottish mercenary (McTaggart) Coetzee storms the basement, and after a short firefight they free Limbani.

With their mission complete, Faulkner's group leaves the barracks for the airport in captured ANC trucks. After being told over the radio that Faulkner had been successful, Chandos' team attacks the main building while Fynn's team take over the control tower. With the airport under the control of the mercenaries they await the arrival of Faulkner's group, but the perimeter guards start to come under attack from Ndofa's Simbas. As they hold off the Simbas and await Faulkner, Fynn uses the control tower's radio to talk the waiting transport plane down onto the runway. The plane lands just as the Simbas break through the perimeter at the opposite end of the runway and start shooting at the plane. At this time Faulkner's group arrives, but the plane's pilot under instructions from Mad Malloy refuses to wait for the mercenaries and promptly takes off, leaving the mercenaries stranded. Faulkner organises a fighting withdrawal, taking with them all the fuel, spare arms and ammunition they can pile on the trucks and jeeps.

The mercenaries ambush the following Simbas and are still in good order, only a few men getting killed. As they make their way south, heading for Limbani's tribal homeland, they approach an old rickety wooden bridge. Only the first few vehicles make it across, as the bridge collapses under the weight of a fuel tanker, leaving the last jeep stranded on the northern river bank. In that jeep is Limbani, Coetzee, McTaggart and medical orderly Whity.

As Faulkner's party reach the village of Limbani's people and find a sort of sanctuary there, Coetzee's party is ambushed by the Simbas. Whity is killed. McTaggart is missing; it is later revealed that he had suicidally charged the Simbas with a grenade in each hand after deliberately drawing them away from Coetzee and Limbani, and Coetzee was also killed while trying to save Limbani. RSM Young, sent by Faulkner, arrives just in time to save Limbani and bring him to the village.

Ndofa contacts Faulkner over the telephone in the local police station, which the mercenaries have taken over and are using as their headquarters. With the risk of Limbani's return starting a civil war Ndofa and Faulkner make a deal to exchange Limbani for one million dollars. Janders disagrees and, holding Faulkner at gunpoint, forces a vote amongst the mercenary officers. When RSM Young votes to follow Faulkner, Janders, Fynn and Chandos vote against Faulkner's plan, as they feel they still owe it to Limbani and the original contract. When the local missionary priest reveals to the mercenaries that there is a Dakota on an airstrip nearby, they decide to use it to escape, with Fynn to pilot it all the way to Rhodesia.

The taking over of the lone Dakota on the all-but-deserted airstrip goes well, but as the bulk of the mercenaries retreat towards the plane they come under heavy attack from the pursuing Simbas. When Faulkner is gravely wounded, unable to carry Faulkner to the plane, the RSM decides to stay with him. Fynn starts up the Dakota's engines and taxis onto the runway as Janders, along with Mercenaries Hammond, Rubens, Ferguson, McFarlane, and Williams, provide cover while the mercenaries get on board. At the last second as the plane begins to start its takeoff, they rush for the plane, both Rubens and Williams are dead, with Ferguson's fate unknown. Hammond is killed while running on the runway, under the gunfire from the Simbas. Only Janders and McFarlane have survived the battle although Janders helps McFarlane who has been wounded; he is safely brought aboard into the Dakota with the help of Chandos, but in doing so Janders misses his own chance to climb onto the accelerating aircraft. With the distance between the plane and Janders growing, he pleads to be killed and not left to the savage Simbas, which Chandos regretfully does with a burst from his rifle. The Dakota suddenly slows down on the runway and U-turns, heading back the way it came, because Fynn is shot in the spine. The wounded Fynn manages to get the Dakota off the ground whilst aided by Chandos and Sgt Benson (the last of the NCOs) and flies the Dakota all the way to Rhodesia.

== The characters ==
- Colonel Allen Faulkner – a former British Army officer and veteran mercenary soldier of the Congolese Civil War, now residing in South Africa. He is a self-confessed alcoholic whose reputation has been severely hit when Limbani was kidnapped.
- Captain Rafer Janders – American soldier of fortune, also a veteran of the Congo. He has a son, Emile, who lives in Switzerland and attends a private school there.
- Lieutenant Jeremy Chandos – younger officer of Faulkner's team, 29 years old; he is single with no attachments and is a mercenary for the money and the action.
- Lieutenant Shawn Fynn – a former pilot and currently a party-loving playboy in London. As a friend of Chandos, he initially rejects the offer of work in what could be a one way journey. He changes his mind after being kicked out by his girlfriend. Homeless and broke he reluctantly joins Faulkner's mercenaries.
- Lieutenant Pieter Coetzee – late of Rhodesia's British South Africa Police, bush war veteran Coetzee is another character living penniless in London. He is described as being stocky, slow-witted, and an uncomplicated racist.
- Regimental Sergeant Major Sandy Young – a former Guards Warrant Officer and veteran comrade of Faulkner. He is described as a short man (5-foot 5 inches) with a fierce nature, with one motivation in life – to serve Faulkner.
- Julius Limbani – former Congolese Prime Minister, now living in exile in Zürich. Limbani hires Faulkner to mount a coup d'état on his behalf. He is based on Moise Tshombe.
- General Ndofa – former head of the Congolese Army and comrade of Faulkner's mercenaries. Now rules the Congo with an iron fist, even he created a secret police unit called the Simbas to create fear in the populace. Ndofa is based on General Mobutu.
- Sergeant Tosh Donaldson – a former Commando who was demobbed in 1947, former rank of Private, and served two tours with Faulkner in 1965 with the rank of Sergeant; now a plumber.
- Taffy "Taff" Williams – a friend to Tosh and also first victim to fall in the battle at the airport.
- Sergeant Jock McTaggart – a veteran Scottish soldier who served in the Black Watch.
- Medic Whity – the unit medical orderly, who is openly gay.
- Sergeant Benson – the last surviving NCO.
