= Bottom to the Top =

1978 song by Joan Armatrading

Single by Joan Armatrading

from the album To the Limit
- B-side: "Your Letter"
- Released: 10 November 1978
- Length: 3:34
- Label: A&M
- Songwriter: Joan Armatrading
- Producer: Glyn Johns

Joan Armatrading singles chronology
"Flight of the Wild Geese" (1978)	"Bottom to the Top" (1978)	"Barefoot and Pregnant" (1979)

"Bottom to the Top" is a song by English singer-songwriter Joan Armatrading, released on 10 November 1978 by A&M Records as the lead single from her fifth studio album, To the Limit (1978). The song was written by Armatrading and produced by Glyn Johns.

== Background ==
Although her previous album, Show Some Emotion (1977), displayed some small reggae influences, "Bottom to the Top" was Armatrading's first serious flirtation with the genre. She was inspired to write the song after hearing some reggae records which her younger brother had. She explained to Melody Maker in 1978, "My little brother had got hold of some really authentic raw records, very basic reggae. I've never heard anything like them before." Armatrading wanted to get as close to an authentic sound as possible, so the song was recorded in one take. She told Melody Maker, "We did the track in one take and [drummer] Henry Spinetti is really excellent on it, he's all over the shop. I mean, he didn't know what was happening. He didn't know where the song began or ended, literally. Apart from me, nobody knew what was happening."

== Release ==
"Bottom to the Top" failed to enter the top 75 of the UK singles chart, but it achieved strong airplay on UK radio. It peaked at number 28 on Record Business magazine's Airplay Guide in its debut week in November 1978, based on the airplay it was receiving on BBC Radio 1 and across Independent Local Radio. BBC Radio 1's Kid Jensen picked it as his "record of the week".

== Critical reception ==
Upon its release, Tony Jasper of Music Week noted the "hint of reggae", "good vocals", "thoughtful lyric", and "knock-out production" from Glyn Johns. He hoped the single would gain a "major chart placing" and added that it was "infinitely better" than Armatrading's previous single, "Flight of the Wild Geese". Tony Parsons of the NME stated, "Joan Armatrading is the archetype late-70s bedsit bard; self-centred poesy couplets pertaining to career-girl opportunities, coffee-table credibility reggae plodding along at let-'em-wait, let-'em-wait pace, a cloying vocal so smug yet sensitive that it's worthy of a Modern World Sweet Baby James." Paul Walker of the Sandwell Evening Mail said that, while the To the Limit album was "excellent", he did not believe "Bottom to the Top" was the "most commercial track from the LP". In the US, Record World called it an "insistent, light reggae number with organ and drums out front". They added, "Her AOR following has grown steadily, and this single could bring her American pop acceptance."

== Track listing ==
7–inch single (UK, Europe, US, South Africa)

1. "Bottom to the Top" – 3:34
2. "Your Letter" – 3:40

7–inch single (Australasia)

1. "Bottom to the Top" – 3:34
2. "Taking My Baby Uptown" – 3:25

== Personnel ==
"Bottom to the Top"

- Joan Armatrading – vocals, acoustic guitar
- Phil Palmer – electric guitar
- Dave Markee – bass guitar
- Dick Sims – organ
- Henry Spinetti – drums

Production

- Glyn Johns – production, engineering

== Charts ==
Chart (1978)	Peak position
UK The Airplay Guide (Record Business)	28
