= Daniel Carney =

Zimbabwean writer (1944–1987)

- Born: 8 August 1944; Beirut, Lebanon
- Died: 6 January 1987 (aged 42); Harare, Zimbabwe
- Occupation: Fiction writer
- Relatives: Erin Pizzey (sister)
- Writing career
- Period: 1969–1985
- Notable work: The Wild Geese (1977)

Daniel Carney (8 August 1944 – 6 January 1987) was a Rhodesian novelist. Three of his novels have been made into films. Carney was a brother of Erin Pizzey, a British writer and feminist activist.

== Biography ==
Daniel Carney was born in Beirut, Lebanon, in 1944, a son of a British diplomat. In 1963, he settled in Southern Rhodesia (soon to be renamed Rhodesia) and joined the British South Africa Police (BSAP), where he served for three and a half years. In 1968, he co-founded the estate agents Fox and Carney in Salisbury, Rhodesia. He died of cancer in 1987.

In 2005, Tango Entertainment released a 30th-anniversary edition of The Wild Geese (1978). The film had been hampered by the collapse of its American distributor, Allied Artists. As a result, the film was only partially distributed in the United States, where it was a box-office disappointment, despite being the 13th-highest-grossing film, worldwide, of 1978.

== Published works ==
- The Whispering Death (1969). Transworld Publishers Limited. 1980. ISBN 0-552-11353-0. Set in Rhodesia, the book was adapted as a 1976 movie titled Whispering Death, a.k.a. Night of the Askaris, Death in the Sun, and Albino.
- The Wild Geese (1977). Corgi. 1978. ISBN 0-552-10869-3. (Originally titled The Thin White Line.) Set in the Congo, it was adapted as the film The Wild Geese (1978), with a screenplay by Reginald Rose (author of 12 Angry Men).
- Under a Raging Sky (1980). Set in Rhodesia, its film rights were optioned by Euan Lloyd, producer of The Wild Geese and Wild Geese II, but the project was not filmed.
- The Square Circle (1982). Bantam Books. July 1987. ISBN 0-553-25380-8. Set in Germany and republished as The Wild Geese II and The Return of the Wild Geese, the novel was adapted as a movie titled Wild Geese II (1985).
- Macau (1985). D.I. Fine. 1985. ISBN 0-917657-10-1. is set in Macau.
