= Peter Ellis (director) =

British director (1948–2006)

- Born: Peter James Ellis; January 28, 1948; London, England
- Died: April 24, 2006 (aged 58); Los Feliz, California, U.S.
- Occupation: Director
- Relatives: Robin Ellis (brother); Jack Ellis (brother)

Peter James Ellis (28 January 1948 – 24 April 2006) was a British director of television episodes, including episodes of shows such as Supernatural and Criminal Minds.

== Personal life ==
He was born in London and educated at Highgate School, as were his brothers, Robin Ellis and Jack Ellis.

== Career ==
He began his career at Granada TV in the UK, being placed on their Director's Course. In the late 1980s, he moved to Hollywood, California, where he was based for the rest of his life. He directed many television episodes, working on productions in the United States, Canada, France, New Zealand, and Spain.

== Death ==
Ellis died on 24 April 2006 in Los Feliz, Los Angeles at the age of 58.

== Directed ==
- Falcon Crest (1981)
- The Optimist (1983)
- Diagnosis Murder (1993)
- Third Watch (1999)
- Queen of Swords (2000)
- Supernatural (2005)
- Highlander

He also directed seven episodes of The Optimist (six of which he co-wrote). The season two episode of Supernatural, "Everybody Loves a Clown", is dedicated to Ellis' memory.
