= Erin Pizzey =

British activist (born 1939)

Erin Pizzey CBE
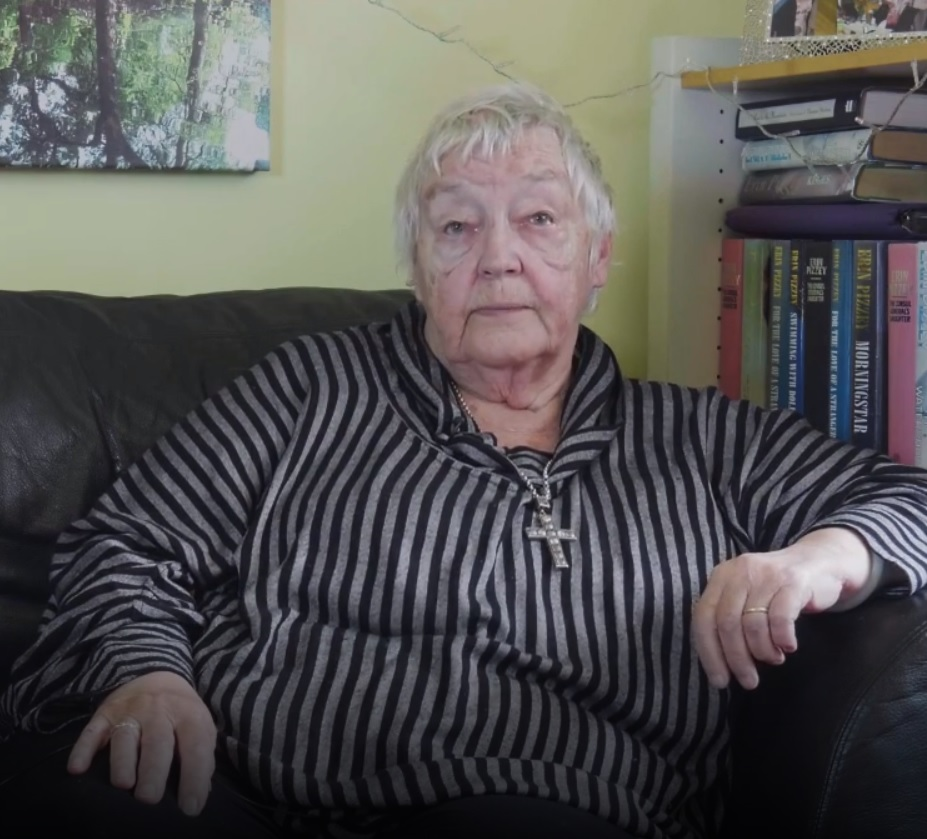
- Pizzey interviewed in 2016
- Born: Erin Patria Margaret Carney; 19 February 1939 (age 87); Qingdao, Republic of China
- Education: Cheikh Anta Diop University
- Occupations: Writer; activist
- Years active: 1971–present
- Organisation: Chiswick Women's Aid
- Known for: Establishing the world's first domestic violence shelters; founding the charity Refuge
- Notable work: Scream Quietly or the Neighbours Will Hear, Prone to Violence
- Spouses: Jack Pizzey (m. 1959; div. 1976) Jeff Shapiro (m. 1980; div. 1994)
- Children: 2, including Amos Pizzey
- Relatives: Daniel Carney (brother)

Erin Patria Margaret Pizzey CBE (/ˈpɪtsi/; born 19 February 1939) is a British men's rights activist and novelist known for her advocacy on behalf of both men's and women's rights and for her work against domestic violence. She set up the world's first and largest domestic violence shelter, Refuge, then known as Chiswick Women's Aid, in 1971.

Pizzey says that she has been the subject of death threats and boycotts because her experience and research into the issue led her to conclude that most domestic violence is reciprocal, and that women are as capable of violence as men. She claims that these threats eventually led to her exile from the UK. She has also stated that she is banned from the refuge she started.

== Early life ==
She was born Erin Carney in Qingdao, China, in 1939, along with her twin sister Rosaleen. Her father was a British diplomat and one of 17 children from a poor Irish family. In 1942, the family moved to Shanghai; shortly thereafter, they were captured by the invading Japanese Army and exchanged for Japanese prisoners of war. She is the sister of writer Daniel Carney, who settled in Rhodesia and is known for his 1978 novel The Wild Geese.

Pizzey moved with her family to Kokstad in South Africa, then at the age of five, to Beirut. At the end of World War II the family went to Toronto, Canada. They moved to Tehran, Iran, and finally settled in England in 1948. Pizzey went to school in Dorset, attending St Antony's junior school and then Leweston School at the age of 11, gaining four O-levels. Her parents were posted to Africa, where she attended Dakar University, Senegal, studying French and English.

== Overview ==
=== Early activism ===
In 1959, Pizzey attended her first meeting at the UK's Women's Liberation Movement (WLM) at the Chiswick house of a local organiser. At this organiser's suggestion, Pizzey agreed to convene a consciousness-raising group at her home in Goldhawk Road. This collective became the Goldhawk Road Group.

The head office of the Women's Liberation Workshop (a women's workshop within the WLM) was in Little Newport Street, in Chinatown, Covent Garden, straddling the City of Westminster and the Borough of Camden. Along with her friend, Alison, and other members of the Goldhawk Road Group, Pizzey found herself at odds with Artemis and Gladiator, who led a clique of younger women within the WLM Workshop head office. Pizzey distanced herself from this clique when she witnessed what she described as "irregular and disrespectful behaviour" towards the money donated by desperate women across the UK. She confronted them over this behaviour, which, according to her, included claiming that telephones were tapped, and labelling of people they did not like as MI5, police and CIA informers or agents. She also was concerned about overhearing discussion of plans to bomb the London store Biba; she reported on this to the police after warning the people involved. Subsequently, Pizzey became aware that the police had the group and offices under surveillance. Pizzey said that she and her fellow members of the Goldhawk Road group were seen as troublesome, because they did not accept others' behaviors and views.

=== Refuge ===
Pizzey set up a women's refuge in Belmont Terrace, Chiswick, London, in 1971. She later opened a number of additional shelters, despite hostility from the authorities. She gained notoriety and publicity for setting up refuges by squatting, most notably in 1975 at the Palm Court Hotel in Richmond. Pizzey's work was widely praised at the time. In 1975, MP Jack Ashley stated in the House of Commons that "The work of Mrs. Pizzey was pioneering work of the first order. It was she who first identified the problem, who first recognised the seriousness of the situation and who first did something practical by establishing the Chiswick aid centre. As a result of that magnificent pioneering work, the whole nation has now come to appreciate the significance of the problem". While being prosecuted by local authorities and appealing matters to the House of Lords, she was recognised for her work.

After Pizzey left the organisation she had founded, Chiswick Women's Aid (renamed Chiswick Family Rescue on 31 March 1979), and moved abroad, it was rebranded as the charity Refuge on 5 March 1993. Although Refuge traces its existence back to Chiswick Women's Aid, Pizzey's name could not be found anywhere on the Refuge website for many decades. It was not until 2 November 2020 that Sandra Horley, the chief executive of Refuge since 1983, mentioned Pizzey's name for the first time again on the Refuge website in a press release upon her retirement.

=== Reciprocity of domestic violence ===
Soon after establishing her first refuge, Pizzey asserted that much of the domestic violence was reciprocal. She reached this conclusion when she asked the women in her refuge about their violence, only to discover most of them were equally violent or more violent than their husbands. In her study Comparative Study of Battered Women And Violence-Prone Women, (co-researched with John Gayford of Warlingham Hospital), Pizzey distinguished between "genuine battered women" and "violence-prone women"; the former defined as "the unwilling and innocent victim of his or her partner's violence" and the latter defined as "the unwilling victim of his or her own violence". This study reported that 62% of the sample population were more accurately described as "violence-prone". Similar findings regarding the mutuality of domestic violence have been confirmed in subsequent studies.

In her book Prone to Violence, Pizzey expressed concern that so little attention was paid to the causes of interpersonal and family violence, stating, "to my amazement, nobody seemed to genuinely want to find out why violent people treat each other the way they do". She also expressed concern for the view expressed by government officials that solutions to the issue of domestic abuse and violence could be found in socialist or communist countries. Pizzey pointed out that marital violence was a great problem in Russia, and China addressed the issue by proclaiming wife-beating a crime punishable by a death sentence. The book looks at what appeared to be learned behaviour, often starting in childhood, linked to hormonal responses. Pizzey described such behaviour as akin to addiction.

She speculated that high levels of hormones and neurochemicals associated with pervasive childhood trauma led to adults who repeatedly engage in violent altercations with intimate partners despite the physical, emotional, legal and financial costs, in unwitting attempts to simulate the emotional impact of traumatic childhood experiences and manifest the learned biochemical state linked to pleasure. The book contains numerous stories of disturbed families, alongside a discussion of the reasons why the modern state care-taking agencies are largely ineffective. Promotional events for the book were met with protest, and Pizzey reported that she herself and co-author Jeff Shapiro needed police protection during the promotional events for the book.

=== Backlash, threats, and harassment ===
In 1981, Pizzey moved to Santa Fe, New Mexico, while targeted by harassment, death threats, bomb threats and defamation campaigns, and dealing with overwork, near collapse, cardiac disease and mental strain. In particular, according to Pizzey, the charity Scottish Women's Aid "made it their business to hand out leaflets claiming that [she] believed that women 'invited violence' and 'provoked male violence'". She stated that the turning point was the intervention of the bomb squad, who required all of her mail to be processed by them before she could receive it, as a "controversial public figure".

Having moved to Santa Fe to write, Pizzey promptly became involved in running a refuge in New Mexico, as well as dealing with sexual abusers and paedophiles. Pizzey said of this work, "I discovered that there were just as many women paedophiles as there were men. Women go undetected, as usual. Working against paedophiles is a very dangerous business." While she was living in Santa Fe, one of her dogs was shot and two others were stolen, which she claimed was a result of racist neighbours. Her family suffered new harassment following the publication of her 1982 book Prone to Violence. Pizzey linked much of the harassment to militant feminists and their objections to her research, findings and work. Describing the harassment, Deborah Ross of The Independent wrote that "the feminist sisterhood went bonkers".

Following the abuse and threats in Santa Fe, Pizzey moved to Cayman Brac, Cayman Islands, where she wrote with her second husband, Jeff Shapiro. Subsequently, she moved to Siena, Italy, where her writing and advocacy work continued. She returned to London in the spring of 1997, homeless due to debt and in increasingly poor health.

== Later work ==
Pizzey remained active in helping victims of domestic violence. She is a patron of the charity ManKind Initiative from 2004, when she received a Roger Witcomb Award. In March 2007, as a guest, she attended the ceremony of opening the first Arab refuge for victims of domestic violence in Bahrain.

In 2013, Pizzey joined the editorial and advisory board of the men's rights organisation A Voice for Men, serving as an Editor and DV Policy Advisor and from January to August wrote thirteen articles for the group's web site. Her two April 2013 articles pertained to two interviews she gave on the Reddit community "IAmA", in which she promoted her Facebook page, and the "AVFM Online Radio" podcast on BlogTalkRadio. She announced her first interview a week prior on /r/MensRights.

In November 2014, Pizzey became owner/manager of the AVFM WhiteRibbon.org website (since renamed Honest-Ribbon.org), which has been criticised by the original White Ribbon Campaign as "a copycat campaign articulating ... archaic views and denials about the realities of gender-based violence".

Pizzey was interviewed for and appeared in the 2016 documentary film The Red Pill by Cassie Jaye about the men's rights movement. Pizzey is a patron of registered charity Compassion In Care which works to "break the chain of elderly abuse" and she wrote an introduction for the book Beyond The Facade by founder Eileen Chubb. In 2022, Pizzey was listed as Honorary Lifetime President Emeritus to CPU: Children Parents United Charity founded by Greg Ellis. The charity appears to be shut down as of April 2023. Pizzey has also been a patron of the shared parenting charity Both Parents Matter in the last few years.

== Libel case ==
In 2009, Pizzey was successful in a libel case against Macmillan Publishers over content in Andrew Marr's book A History of Modern Britain. The publication had falsely claimed she had once been part of a militant group, The Angry Brigade, that staged bomb attacks in the 1970s. The publisher also recalled and destroyed the offending version of the book and republished it with the error removed. The link to the Angry Brigade was made in 2001, in an interview with The Guardian, in which the article states that she was "thrown out" of the feminist movement after threatening to inform police about a planned bombing by the Angry Brigade of the clothes shop Biba. "I said that if you go on with this – they were discussing bombing Biba [the legendary department store in Kensington – I'm going to call the police in, because I really don't believe in this".

== Personal life ==
Pizzey married Jack Pizzey in 1959. Jack Pizzey was a naval lieutenant whom she first met in Hong Kong. They had two children, including Amos. She divorced him in 1976, and divorced her second husband, Jeff Scott Shapiro, in 1994. Pizzey lives in Twickenham, south-west London. She was diagnosed with cancer in 2000.

In 2000, Pizzey's grandson Keita Craig, who had schizophrenia, hanged himself in a prison cell. Pizzey and her family campaigned against the coroner's verdict of death by hanging and in 2001 a jury at a second inquest unanimously found that Keita's death was contributed to by the neglect of prison staff. The case was the first to reach a verdict of neglect in a suicide case.

Pizzey was appointed Commander of the Order of the British Empire (CBE) in the 2024 New Year Honours for services to the victims of domestic abuse.

== Books ==
=== Non-fiction ===
- Pizzey, Erin (1974). Scream quietly or the neighbours will hear. Harmondsworth Baltimore: Penguin. ISBN 9780140523119. Details.
- Pizzey, Erin (1981). The slut's cook book. London: Macdonald & Co. ISBN 9780354047241. Details.
- Pizzey, Erin; Shapiro, Jeff (1982). Prone to violence. Feltham, Middlesex, England: Hamlyn. ISBN 9780600205517. Details.
- Pizzey, Erin (1983). Erin Pizzey collects-- : an anthology of her writing, personally introduced. Feltham, Middlesex, England: Hamlyn. ISBN 9780600206866. Details.
- Pizzey, Erin (1995). Wild child: an autobiography. Siena: Erin Pizzey. ISBN 9788890009600. Details.
- Pizzey, Erin (1998). The emotional terrorist and the violence-prone. Ottawa: Commoners' Pub. ISBN 9780889701038. Details.
- Pizzey, Erin (2005). Infernal child: world without love. Twickenham: Little Hermit. ISBN 9780954000219. Details.
- Pizzey, Erin (2011). This way to the revolution: a memoir. London Chicago: Peter Owen. ISBN 9780720613605. Details.

=== Fiction ===
- The Watershed
- In the Shadow of the Castle
- First Lady
- The Consul General's Daughter
- The Snow Leopard of Shanghai
- Other Lovers
- Swimming with Dolphins
- For the Love of a Stranger
- Kisses
- The Wicked World of Women

== Awards ==
- International Order of Volunteers For Peace, Diploma of Honour (Italy) 1981.
- Nancy Astor Award for Journalism 1983.
- World Congress of Victimology (San Francisco) 1987 – Distinguished Leadership Award.
- St. Valentino Palm d'Oro International Award for Literature, 14 February 1994, Italy.
- SAFE "Woman of the Year" Award Winner, 2022.

== See also ==
- Intimate partner violence
- Women's Aid Federation of England
- Karen DeCrow
- Domestic violence against men
- Men's rights movement
- Earl Silverman
- Warren Farrell
