= The Man Called Noon =

1973 film

- Directed by: Peter Collinson
- Starring: Richard Crenna
- Music by: Luis Bacalov
- Production companies: Euan Lloyd Productions; Films Montana; Finarco; Frontier Film Productions
- Distributed by: National General Pictures
- Release date: 6 August 1973
- Running time: 98 min.
- Country: Spain
- Language: English

The Man Called Noon is a 1973 film directed by Peter Collinson. It stars Richard Crenna and Stephen Boyd. It is based on a 1970 Louis L'Amour novel of the same name.

== Cast ==
- Richard Crenna as Noon, a gunman who develops amnesia after an attempted assassination.
- Stephen Boyd as Rimes, a dangerous outlaw who becomes Noon's companion
- Rosanna Schiaffino as Fan Davidge, a woman in danger who falls for Noon
- Farley Granger as Judge Niland, a scheming man who covets Noon's hidden fortune
- Patty Shepard as Peg Cullane, a woman who plots against Noon
- Ángel del Pozo as Ben Janish
- Howard Ross as Bayles
- Aldo Sambrell as Kissling
- José Jaspe as Henneker
- Carlos Bravo as Lang (credited as Charlie Bravo)
- Ricardo Palacios as Brakeman
