= April in Portugal (film) =

1956 British film by Euan Lloyd

- Directed by: Euan Lloyd
- Written by: O. Henry; Charles Belden
- Produced by: Irving Allen; Albert R. Broccoli
- Starring: Trevor Howard; Jocelyn Lane; Amalia Rodrigues
- Cinematography: Ted Moore
- Music by: George Melachrino
- Production company: Warwick Films
- Distributed by: Columbia Pictures
- Release date: 20 April 1956 (U.S.)
- Running time: 20 minutes
- Country: United Kingdom
- Language: English

April in Portugal is a 1954 travel film directed by Euan Lloyd, starring Jocelyn Lane and narrated by Trevor Howard. It was released in 1956.

== Cast ==
- Jocelyn Lane as guide (as Jackie Lane)
- Antonio Dos Santos
- Amália Rodrigues
- Trevor Howard as narrator
- Fernando Gil and his Ballet
- Santos Moreira

== Production ==
In order to get permission to film The Cockleshell Heroes in Portugal, Warwick Films had to make the documentary April in Portugal.

== Reception ==
The Monthly Film Bulletin wrote: "This brief visit to Portugal is given the customary CinemaScopic treatment, and, in its effort to reveal the varied splendours of Lisbon, succeeds in telling us very little. Miss Jackie Lane, the film's guide (who wears a different creation in almost every shot) is accompanied by a smiling bullfighter, Antonio dos Santos, and a fulsome commentary delivered by Trevor Howard. The fudos singer, Amalia Rodrigues, renders several well-known songs – one of which, sung from a yacht on the Tagus, suddenly suggests that the film has taken to parodying itself – a folk dance team perform a few steps, a military parade is held in honour of the President of Brazil, and Antonio himself provides the climax shot at a Portuguese bull-fight. These, and sundry other events, are photographed in bright glossy colours, and the title tune is played, in a rich stercophonic arrangement, by George Melachrino's Orchestra. A chromium-piied travelogue which, nevertheless, wears a decidedly old-fashioned look."
