= Barefoot and Pregnant (song) =

1978 song by Joan Armatrading

Single by Joan Armatrading

from the album To the Limit
- B-side: "Your Letter"
- Released: January 1979
- Length: 3:40
- Label: A&M
- Songwriter: Joan Armatrading
- Producer: Glyn Johns

Joan Armatrading singles chronology
"Bottom to the Top" (1978)	"Barefoot and Pregnant" (1979)	"Steppin' Out" (1979)

"Barefoot and Pregnant" is a song by English singer-songwriter Joan Armatrading, released in January 1979 by A&M Records as the second and final single from her fifth studio album, To the Limit (1978). The song was written by Armatrading and produced by Glyn Johns. Since its release, "Barefoot and Pregnant" has become a feminist anthem.

== Background ==
Armatrading was inspired to write "Barefoot and Pregnant" based on a conversation she had with her agent about a relationship he knew where the man was possessive. He would restrict his partner's freedom by repeatedly getting her pregnant and tried to ensure she would stay by giving her all the material things she wanted. Armatrading titled the song after the figure of speech, which she had never heard before until her agent used it during their conversation. Armatrading told Beat Instrumental in 1978, "'Barefoot and Pregnant' came out of conversation and that line – it's a great line. I was talking with my agent about wealth and [he] said that some men, when they have really beautiful women, like to keep that beauty to themselves. They put her in the best house, high up on the hill, where she's got everything around her. They keep her pregnant so she's got loads of kids [and] can't go out, and nobody gets to meet her." She added to Melody Maker, "[Some] blokes are like that; to keep a woman like that, to give her maybe lots of things but not company." In the song, the narrator realises the possessive nature of her partner's actions and decides she will leave him ("I gotta get away just as fast as I can"/"I got myself into this thing and I'll find a way out"). Armatrading revealed to Record Collector in 2018, "I'm a very positive person, and I like to think that people can help themselves out of bad situations."

After its release on To the Limit in 1978, "Barefoot and Pregnant" gained popularity among women's movements and has since become recognised as a feminist anthem. Armatrading has happily accepted its adoption by such groups, but has said it was never her intention to specifically appeal to them and she does not always agree with their views. She told Musician in 1985, "I don't want to limit [my] music to women's movements, you know? If a little, pretty, feminine woman who wants to stay at home and looks after the kids, if she likes that song ['Barefoot and Pregnant'], I resent a women's movement stopping her. That's the sort of thing I don't like. And I like it if a guy likes that song as well. I don't want my music limited by anybody, really, 'cause I'm not limiting it."

== Critical reception ==
Upon its release as a single in the US, Record World magazine wrote, "Armatrading already has a retinue of followers and this, one of her most commercial singles, will likely pick up more. Her vocal style is unique and ready for pop play." In a review of To the Limit, the UK's Burton Observer and Chronicle noted that the song is "a perfect example of how Joan Armatrading blends powerful words with equally memorable music". A reviewer for the Kidderminster Shuttle stated, "Gone is the rather soft approach to her lyrics and back is that sharply-honed cutting edge. Listen to 'Barefoot and Pregnant' and you'll see what I mean." In US reviews of the album, Doug McMillan of the Reno Gazette-Journal called "Barefoot and Pregnant" a "defiant 'walking-out' song – yet without bitterness – a woman who blames herself for self-deception as much as the man who deceived her". Dave Connolly of AllMusic retrospectively stated that "those enamored of her island melodies will find them" on the track.

== Track listing ==
7–inch single (US and Australia)

1. "Barefoot and Pregnant" – 3:40
2. "Your Letter" – 3:39

== Personnel ==
"Barefoot and Pregnant"

- Joan Armatrading – vocals, acoustic guitar
- Phil Palmer – electric guitar
- Dave Markee – bass guitar
- Red Young – keyboards
- Henry Spinetti – drums

Production

- Glyn Johns – production, engineering
