= Amos Pizzey =

British businessman (born 1967)

- Born: 1967 (age 58–59); London, England
- Occupation: Businessman
- Spouse: Lisa I'Anson
- Children: 1
- Parents: Jack Pizzey (father); Erin Pizzey (mother)

Amos Pizzey (born 1967) is a British businessman and the founder of internet company Talenthouse.

== Music career ==
At the age of 14, he joined Boy George’s band, Culture Club, using the name Captain Crucial and toasted on the Kissing To Be Clever song "Love Twist" as well as "Murder Rap Trap", the B-side to "I'm Afraid Of Me" (also included on the album's 2003 reissue as a bonus track). Two years later, he signed his first international contract with Richard Branson at Virgin Records. Over the next two decades, Pizzey signed with various record labels and was also producing and remixing music for artists such as Madonna, George Michael, Red Hot Chili Peppers, and Boy George (toasting on various remixes of his song Everything I Own). He also toured with Boy George's other band, Jesus Loves You, and performed on their singles Generations of Love and Sweet Toxic Love. It was during this time that he forged a close relationship with English DJ and singer Jeremy Healy. The two had a series of hit records and created the multi-platform entertainment concept known as Bleachin', which tells the story of inner city club culture through film, fashion, art, music and photography. Pizzey and Healy went on to sign the project with BMG Records, and were consequently photographed by Annie Leibovitz for American Vogue at the request of fashion designer John Galliano. In the year 2000, Pizzey became a founding partner of London’s Met Bar, which became popular with artists.

== Talenthouse ==
In 2009 he relocated to the California where he founded Talenthouse, described as ‘The World's Open Source Creative Department’, which was initially located in Palo Alto before moving to Los Angeles. Talenthouse is a computing platform that hosts open source creative briefs that generate creative content at scale for its clients while providing opportunities for creators. Campaigns have involved artists including U2, Paul McCartney, Tom Ford, Dolce and Gabbana, Luc Besson, Naomi Campbell, Lady Gaga and Dr. Dre and for marketers such as Adidas, Intel, Airbnb, Vice Media, Macy’s, Time Inc, Universal Music Group, Fox Films, Warner Bros and Microsoft.

As founder, creative sirector and board member, Pizzey helped broker partnerships with brands and artists and raise $30 million in funding.

== Personal life ==
Pizzey is married to British radio and television presenter Lisa I'Anson; they live in Los Angeles and have a daughter.
