= Parity (charity) =

United Kingdom-based equal rights organization

- Founded: 1986
- Type: Equal rights charity
- Registration no.: 1107795
- Purpose: Men's equality
- Headquarters: Olympic House 28-42 Clements Road Ilford Essex IG1 1BA
- Region served: United Kingdom
- Key people: David Yarwood (Hon Secretary) 29 August 1986 – 15 February 2015, Chandrakant Vaghela (Hon. Secretary – 15 February 2015 – 20 June 26; Chairs: David Lindsay 1986–1991; Maurice Oldfield 1991–1998; John Mays 1998 to 8 June 2019 Rex Bourne June 2019 to 20 June 2026 Andrew Butterly (Chair) 20 June 2026
- Revenue: £8694 (2025)
- Website: https://parity.charity/
- Formerly called: Campaign for Equal State Pension Ages

Parity is a United Kingdom-based men's rights organisation, which describes itself as campaigning to promote and protect the equality of men and women under the law. Its main focus has been the discrimination against men in the area of state pensions and associated benefits, and most of its notable successes have occurred in this field. The organisation was previously called Campaign for Equal State Pension Ages.

== History ==
Parity was formed in 1986 as the "Campaign for Equal State Pension Ages" (CESPA) and its principal aim was to obtain for men the same [state pension] age as enjoyed by women. The organisation changed its name to "Parity" in 1997 to reflect growing concern regarding increased unequal treatment of men and women in other areas by the state.

CESPA's inaugural meeting was held on 29 August 1986 in Committee Room 1 of Manchester Town Hall. The ten founder members were G.W. Alderton, D.Higgins, D.J.D Yarwood, J.H Bennett, E.L Anderson, J.Greenwood, M.D Davidson, J.Graham, D.G Lindsay, and J. Bradfield. The original CESPA constitution was agreed. The meeting appointed David Lindsay as chairman, Geoff Alderton as vice-chairman, David Yarwood as Hon Secretary and John Bennett as Treasurer.

Parity was denied charitable status for a number of years because it was seeking changes in the law to redress statutory sex discrimination, and thus was deemed to be political. It finally gained charitable status in 2005 following a change to the Human Rights Act.

== Organisation ==
The organisation is run entirely by volunteers and receives no public funding. It had an income of £1,016 in 2017.

In its constitution it states its objectives are "to promote and protect the equal rights of men and women to the enjoyment of all civil, political, economic social and cultural rights under the law" and "to institute proceedings in the UK or appropriate European Courts for the purpose of establishing or protecting any such equal rights."

== Achievements ==
Parity has had some notable successes over the years, particularly in addressing statutory sex discrimination. Their campaigns have stopped government sex discrimination which, in the case of winter fuel payments, had denied an estimated £20 million per year to males between the ages of 60–65.

Parity claims successes in four main areas: prescription charges, winter fuel payments, bus travel concessions and, in association with others, widower's benefits:

=== Prescription charges ===
Parity's first major success began in 1993 under its original name, when CESPA member Cyril Richardson, an asthmatic, took the government to court over sex discrimination in entitlement for free prescriptions. Eventually, in 1995 the European Court of Justice ruled that it was unlawful to charge men aged 60–65 for prescriptions when they were free to women. As a result, men now receive benefits in the order of an estimated £30 million per annum. Additionally, £10 million in charges was refunded to those who had wrongly paid for prescriptions in the previous 3 months before the ruling.

=== Winter fuel payments ===
In 1998 Parity member John Taylor went to the High Court to contest the fact that the government was denying winter fuel payments to men aged 60–65 that women were able to receive. It was argued that this was a breach of European laws on equality in social security, and that such discrimination was blatant and unjustifiable. The case was referred to the European Court of Justice who ruled in Mr Taylor's favour in December 1999. The ruling meant up to £26 million per annum in benefits being given to men that otherwise would have been denied.

=== Bus travel concessions ===
In 2000 Parity took the Government to the European Court of Human Rights over the fact that it denied free bus travel to men aged 60–65. Despite Parity's previous successes, the government had refused to end discrimination in this area. However, in June 2001 it became clear that Parity would win the case if it went to court and the government relented, with John Prescott announcing men would receive free bus passes from age 60. Controversially, Prescott hailed the move as "another example of the Government providing extra help for pensioners" whereas it had effectively been forced into the move by the European Court of Human Rights. The Travel Concessions (Eligibility) Bill finally passed in 2003 resulting in males receiving the £50 million per annum in benefits that the state had denied them.

=== Widowers benefits ===
Parity campaigned to end sexism in the payment of widows benefits and bereavement tax allowances. These were previously only paid to women and not men. The campaign achieved success in 2001 as a result the benefits are now available to both genders.

=== Domestic violence statistics ===
In 2008 Parity campaigned to stop the Crown Prosecution Service making false statements that the "overwhelming" majority of domestic violence victims were women, whereas in fact about one in three victims is male. With the aid of the UK Statistics Authority the organisation succeeded and the incorrect claims were removed. The organisation also forced Gillian Morgan of the Welsh Assembly to stop making the same claims in the "Strategic Action Plan to Address Violence to Women".

== Current campaigns ==
Parity's main current campaign is to equalise the state pension ages for men and women in the United Kingdom. Currently this is now due to take place in 2018.

Other objectives include:

- Equal state funding for treatment and research of male and female specific diseases.
- Equal treatment of male and female victims of domestic violence.
- Better government policies to ensure a more equal gender balance in primary school teaching and to boost the academic achievements of working class white children.
- Funding for research into life expectancy inequalities between men and women.
- Equal status for separated parents and better enforcement of contact and maintenance orders.
- Equal anonymity for defendants and complainants in sex offence cases until conviction.

== Supporters ==
Parity's present patrons are Mr Mark Brooks OBE and Dr Richard A,W, Bradford .

== See also ==
- ManKind Initiative
