= Jack Pizzey (broadcaster) =

British television personality

- Born: Sussex, England
- Spouse: Erin Pizzey (1959–1976)
- Children: 2, including Amos Pizzey
- Presenting career
- Station: BBC

Jack Pizzey is a British television documentary-maker, presenter and author.

== Naval career ==
Pizzey served in the Royal Navy, starting as a Dartmouth cadet at 16 and retiring as a lieutenant at 27. He served mainly in submarines: HMS Tally-Ho and Thermopylae in the Mediterranean, HMS Talent in home waters and HMS Andrew in the Far East, as Torpedo Officer and Navigator. In the cruiser HMS Newcastle (a sister ship to HMS Belfast which is now a floating museum across the Thames from the Tower of London) he toured the Far East with a front row seat at the end of the British Empire, watching the Union Jack being hauled down in various newly independent colonies to which he returned twenty years later as a documentary-maker.

== Broadcasting career ==
After the Royal Navy, Pizzey joined the BBC as a general trainee, and, after a spell as co-anchor of the new BBC Radio flagship The World at One, he moved to television and joined the also new and top-rating BBC1 TV show Nationwide as a roving reporter. After three years he moved into full-length documentaries with BBC2's Man Alive. There he presented some fifty documentaries on subjects ranging from the Tour de France to a ghetto hospital in Chicago, and two BBC2 full length warts-and-all profiles of King Juan Carlos of Spain and King Hussein of Jordan.

Leaving the BBC, Pizzey moved to Sydney as a reporter-producer on the ABC's Four Corners. For the ABC, he authored and presented an eight-part series on South America which was shown by the PBS in America as South American Journey and by BBC2 and NHK Japan as Sweat of the Sun, Tears of the Moon. People magazine stated "every PBS documentary should be half as good" and in an earlier edition that year said "Better than I ever imagined documentary could be . . he gives you a continent alive. A+" And The New York Times said he is "eclectic and romantic." In Britain The Times on 1 June 1986 called the series "a triumph of concertinaed history capturing the rhythms, the self-deceptions and the lie of this extraordinary land." The series won Australia's Logie Award, and Pizzey's book Sweat of the Sun, Tears of the Moon was published in the UK by the Cornhill Press (ISBN 0-356-12697-8) and in Australia by the ABC (ISBN 0 642 52968 X).

One critic coined the phrase "thinking man's travelogue" for Pizzey's work and he went on independently to make series about Australia (Aussies!) and about South East Asia (Slow Boat from Surabaya) of which The Independent on 18 August 1989 said that he was poetic yet "took the honourable course of presenting the viewer with . . . solid unpalatable facts." And the Financial Times on 29 August 1989 said, linking Pizzey to the outstanding reporters of the early days of the BBC, "remarkably stylish and literate."

Back in England, he produced and directed four series travelling the country for ITV's regions, later shown on either the BBC or Channel Four, and then drove from Peking to Paris with a crowd of adventurers in antique cars to celebrate the original Great Race by making a twenty-part documentary series Peking to Paris for the Travel Channel in the UK and the Arts & Entertainment Channel in the US.

Pizzey also appears in a special feature of the DVD release of Doctor Who – The Claws of Axos, in which he tells how the story came to be converted back from NTSC to PAL using innovative technology.

== Personal life ==
In 1959, Pizzey married Erin Pizzey and has two children with her. She divorced him in 1976.
