= Refuge (United Kingdom charity) =

Domestic violence charity

- Founded: 1971
- Founder: Erin Pizzey
- Type: Registered UK charity (number 277424)
- Purpose: Domestic abuse, violence against women and girls
- Headquarters: 3rd Floor, One America Square, 17 Crosswall London, EC3N 2LB
- Coordinates: 51°30′41.508″N 0°4′37.56″W
- Origins: Chiswick women's shelter
- Region served: National
- Method: Provision of a national network of specialist domestic abuse services for women and their children
- Revenue: £33,983,581 (2021)
- Employees: 460
- Website: refuge.org.uk
- Formerly called: Chiswick Women's Aid (1971–1979); Chiswick Family Rescue (1979–1993)

Refuge is a United Kingdom charity providing specialist support for women and children experiencing domestic violence. The organisation, founded in 1971 by author and ex-feminist men's rights activist Erin Pizzey provides a national network of specialist services, including emergency refuge accommodation (refuges), community outreach, independent domestic violence advocacy (IDVAs), culturally specific services and a team of child support workers. Refuge also runs the Freephone 24-Hour National Domestic Abuse Helpline. The National Domestic Abuse Helpline specialises in supporting women, but will support other genders including men, especially out of hours.

Its safe house in Chiswick, West London was the first of its kind. Refuge remains the largest domestic violence organisation in the United Kingdom.

On any given day, Refuge's services supports thousands of women and children. The charity says it is committed to working towards a world where women and children can live in safety, free from fear. No services are provided for men.

== History ==
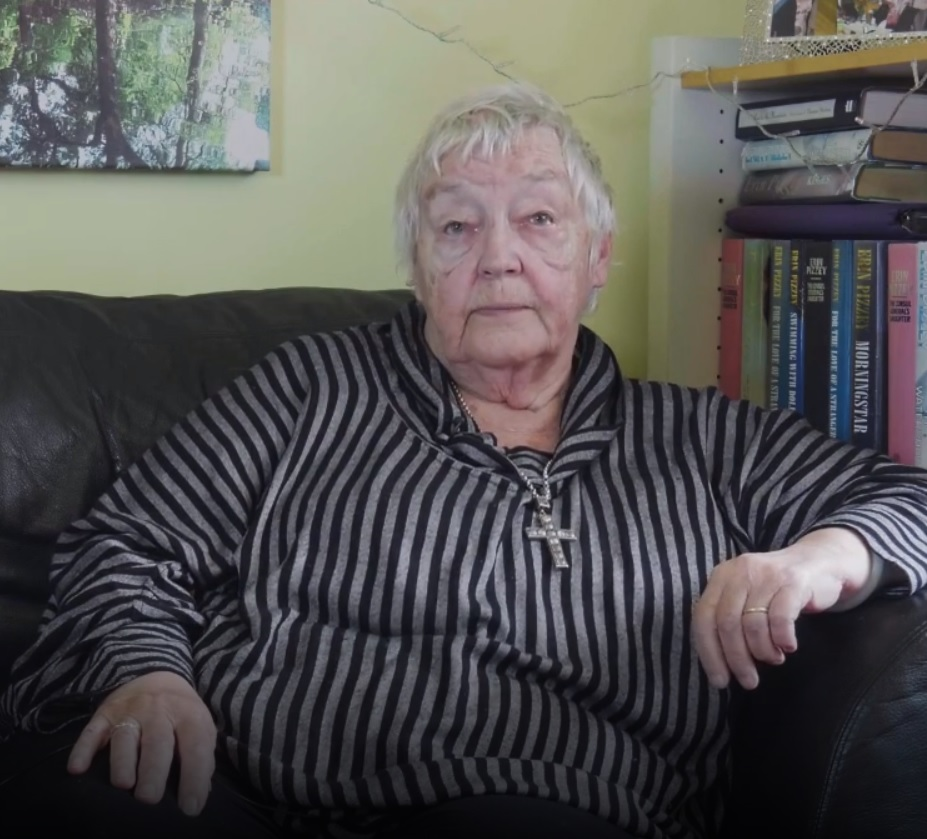
Refuge was founded by Erin Pizzey.

Erin Pizzey opened the modern world's first refuge for women and children escaping domestic violence, in Chiswick, west London, in 1971. In 1979, the organisation became a registered charity, changing its name from Chiswick Women's Aid to Chiswick Family Rescue. In 1993, the charity changed its name to Refuge, reflecting its growing national status. This followed a funding crisis in 1992 when the charity faced closure, before Sandra Horley made a personal appeal to Diana, Princess of Wales who made a donation and several private visits to the charity's shelters, raising its profile.

In 1997, three of the charity's trustees resigned in a controversy over one of their number's links to a group associated with false memory syndrome.

=== Exiling of Founder ===
Pizzey has been the subject of boycotts due to her reaching conclusions, from both her experience setting up and running Refuge and from subsequent academic research, that most domestic violence is reciprocal and that women are as capable of violence as men. She has stated that in order to properly combat domestic violence, a society must not only protect the victims (both male and female) but also understand what drives the perpetrators (both male and female) to violence and support them in their rehabilitation to prevent reocurrence. Refuge claims these views conflict with its mission as an organization dedicated to women and children. Subsequent academic research into domestic violence has come to similar conclusions and supported Pizzey's position. The escalation of these boycotts into threats is what eventually led to her fleeing the UK for her safety. Pizzey has claimed that the threats were from militant feminists, and that the turning point for her was when the Bomb Squad intervened and required all her mail to be processed by them before she could receive it. She is now banned from Refuge.

Pizzey has claimed that Refuge, and her successor as head of the charity Dame Sandra Horley, were so opposed to her research and views because they wished to ensure as much money as possible went to their charities and to women, and did not want to have to "share the pot" with male victims. Horley, who was paid remuneration worth up to £220,000 per year as head of Refuge and who retired as CEO shortly after Refuge was investigated by the Charities Commission on accusations of bullying, nepotism and questionable spending of charity resources which disproportionately benefitted her, is on the record as having stated "There are resource implications... if we put across this idea that the abuse of men is as great as the abuse of women, then it could seriously affect our funding".

== Activities ==
Refuge provides a national network of refuges across 15 local authority areas in England.

Refuge also provides a number of other services, including Community Outreach and Independent Domestic Violence Advocacy services, and runs the Freephone 24 Hour National Domestic Abuse Helpline 0808 2000 247.

Refuge also seeks to raise awareness of domestic violence and challenge negative social attitudes. It also responds to key policy consultations and debates, ensuring that the voices and needs of abused women and children are reflected in national legislation.

== Campaigns ==
Refuge runs campaigns to raise awareness of domestic violence and reach out to women and children who experience domestic violence.

In 1999, Sheryl Gascoigne supported Refuge's campaign 'It's a Matter of Life and Death'. She had recently divorced footballer Paul Gascoigne following her experience of domestic violence at his hands.

In 2008, Refuge created an advertising campaign designed to raise awareness of the warning signs of domestic violence, highlighting the statistic that two women are killed every week by current or former partners in England and Wales. The campaign was based on a YouGov survey showing that young women lack awareness of the techniques used by violent men to control women.

In 2009, Refuge conducted a high-profile awareness raising campaign titled Four Ways To Speak Out in partnership with the cosmetics company Avon Products. The campaign was supported by a number of families whose loved ones had been killed as a result of domestic violence.

In 2012, Refuge launched an online video campaign called Don't Cover It Up, with popular make-up artist Lauren Luke. The video was designed to raise awareness of the fact that many women who experience domestic violence keep it hidden. The video has been viewed over 2.3 million times to date and won numerous awards including the coveted Creative Circle Gold of Golds award.

In 2013, Refuge launched a campaign calling on the Government to open a public inquiry into the response of the police and other state agencies to victims of domestic violence. The campaign was backed by the family of Maria Stubbings, who was murdered by her ex-partner in 2008. An investigation by the Independent Police Complaints Commission in 2013 found that Essex Police made a series of failings in their response to Maria.

== Research ==
Refuge undertakes research into the effects of domestic violence and issues surrounding service provision for abused women and children. In 2011, Refuge and the NSPCC, funded by the City Bridge Trust, produced a report on the services for children living with domestic violence in London.

Together with the charity Respect, Refuge has produced a domestic abuse resource manual for employers. This resource is designed to help employers and human resources professionals respond to employees who are victims or perpetrators of abuse. In 2011, Refuge and Respect published an evaluation of the resource manual after piloting it with a county council.

In 2010, Refuge conducted a scoping study into the experience of forced marriage of women from Middle Eastern and North East African communities. In 2009, Refuge produced a report titled 'Starting in School' as a result of a YouGov survey exploring young women's attitudes and knowledge of the warning signs of domestic violence. In 2008, Refuge released a study into the impacts of financial abuse on women and children experiencing domestic violence.

In 2005, Refuge produced a report on assessment and intervention for pre-school children exposed to domestic violence. It identifies ways to support young children and help them overcome their experiences.

== Funding ==
In 2010, Refuge had an income of £10,284,785. The funding is mostly from United Kingdom taxpayers via the Home Office and local councils. In 2009, a member of staff received over £190,000 p.a. with employer pension contributions to the highest paid staff of over £70,000.

== Patrons ==
Patrons of the charity include Cherie Booth, Patrick Stewart, Jo Brand, Helena Kennedy and Fiona Bruce.

=== Sir Patrick Stewart ===
In 2007, English actor Patrick Stewart was appointed a patron of Refuge, having witnessed his mother experience violence from his father as a child. In October 2011, Stewart presented a BBC Lifeline appeal for Refuge and interviewed a woman whose daughter had been killed by an abusive ex-partner. In May 2013, while answering fans' questions at Comicpalooza, Stewart spoke about his work with Refuge in response to a fan asking what he was most proud of outside of acting. In September 2014, writing in the New Statesman, Stewart backed Refuge's campaign for a public inquiry into the police and state response to domestic violence.

In December 2014 Stewart backed Refuge's fundraising appeal to keep its refuge service in Stratford-Upon-Avon open, commenting: "It is no exaggeration to say that services like this save lives. Behind the walls of these extraordinary houses, specialist staff help women and children to rebuild every aspect of their lives, helping them to stay safe from violent men, access health services, legal advocacy and immigration advice, as well as get back into work or education."

Stewart has also expressed his support for Refuge in national news outlets on a number of occasions.

== See also ==
- Erin Pizzey
- Men's rights movement
- National Coalition Against Domestic Violence
- Women's Aid Federation of England
- National Commission for Men
- ManKind Initiative
