= Albino (film) =

1976 film

- VHS cover
- Directed by: Jürgen Goslar
- Written by: Scott Finch; Jürgen Goslar
- Based on: The Whispering Death by Daniel Carney
- Produced by: Stefan Abendroth; Jürgen Goslar; Barrie Saint Clair
- Starring: Christopher Lee; James Faulkner; Trevor Howard; Sybil Danning; Horst Frank
- Cinematography: Wolfgang Treu
- Edited by: Richard Meyer
- Music by: Erich Ferstl
- Distributed by: Troma Entertainment
- Release date: 1976
- Running time: 97 minutes
- Countries: West Germany; United Kingdom; South Africa; Rhodesia
- Language: English

Albino (also known as The Night of the Askari, Death in the Sun and Whispering Death) is a 1976 West German thriller film directed by Jürgen Goslar and starring Christopher Lee, James Faulkner and Sybil Danning filmed on location during the Rhodesian Bush War. The film is based on the novel The Whispering Death by Daniel Carney.

== Plot ==
Terrick (James Faulkner), a British South Africa Police officer in rural Rhodesia, looks forward towards the end of his police service and early retirement to his farm with his fiancée, Sally (Sybil Danning). Terrick's hopes for a peaceful life with Sally are shattered, however, when black nationalist guerrillas attack the farm. Sally is raped and murdered by the guerrilla leader, an albino known only by the moniker "Whispering Death" (Horst Frank). Consumed by grief, Terrick and his farmworkers, led by Katchemu (Sam Williams) set out to avenge Sally on their own. They subsequently learn that the guerrillas have summoned the local villagers to a meeting to politicize them and lay an ambush for "Whispering Death" there. However Terrick's party opens fire prematurely, killing and injuring some of the civilians present.

The Rhodesian government demands that Terrick's police superior, Bill (Christopher Lee) hold him accountable for his recklessness and bring him to justice. From its perspective he has endangered the war effort by inflaming the relationship between the security forces and the locals through his irresponsible actions. Bill obligingly orders a manhunt for Terrick, but most of the policemen sympathize with their onetime colleague and are demoralized by the fact they are being ordered to pursue him instead of the guerrillas. They abandon the manhunt and return to their homes. Due to the apparent unwillingness of the police to apprehend Terrick, the Rhodesian Special Air Service is called in to perform the manhunt.

"Whispering Death" and his guerrillas decide to flee across the border to their sanctuaries in a neighbouring country. However, Terrick and Katchemu, who is an expert tracker, are hot on their trail. The duo become increasingly desperate, with Katchemu torturing a captured guerrilla for information. During a series of bloody skirmishes, Katchemu and nearly all the guerrillas are killed, leaving only Terrick and "Whispering Death" to face each other. Terrick gains the upper hand and stabs his opponent to death. The next morning, pursuing Rhodesian troops finally catch up to Terrick, but he is no longer coherent, having lost his mind as a result of the collective trauma he endured. When he threatens the soldiers with his rifle, they shoot him dead.

== Cast ==
- James Faulkner as Terrick
- Christopher Lee as Bill, Member-In-Charge
- Horst Frank as "Whispering Death"
- Sybil Danning as Sally
- Sascha Hehn as Peter
- Trevor Howard as Dr. Johannes
- Erik Schumann as Captain Turnbull
- Sam Williams as Katchemu

== Reception ==
Film scholars Mark Miller and Tom Johnson described Albino as "a nasty, repugnant tale of racial hatred and revenge", criticizing the "exploitative" treatment which contemporary Rhodesian sociopolitical issues received. However, they also praised Lee and Faulkner's performances.
