= Museo Nazionale Romano =

Museum in Rome, Italy

National Roman Museum Museo Nazionale Romano
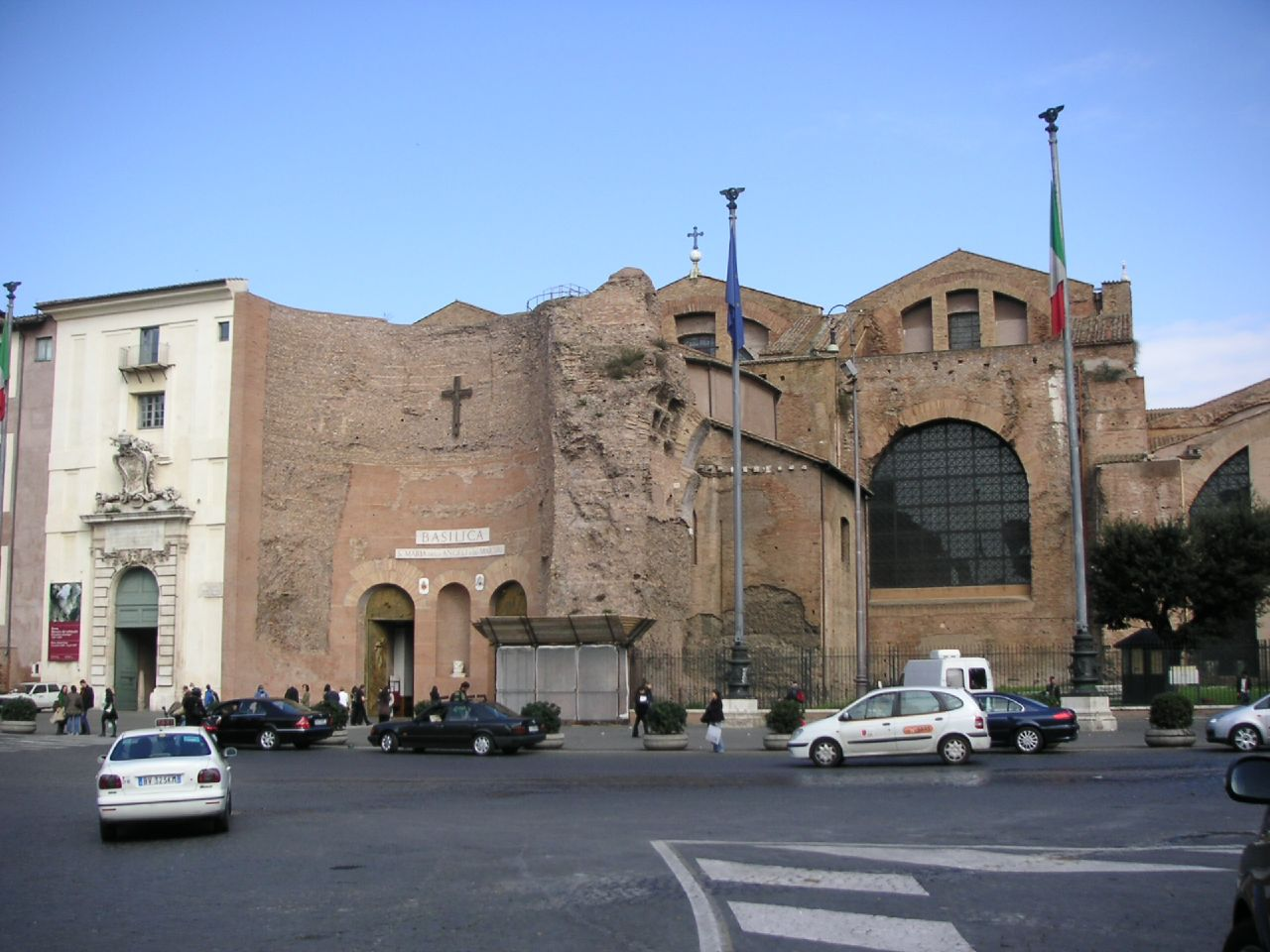
- Baths of Diocletian
- Click on the map for a fullscreen view
- Established: 1889
- Location: Via Enrico de Nicola, 79 (Baths of Diocletian); Largo di Villa Peretti, 1 (Palazzo Massimo alle Terme); Via Sant’Apollinare, 46 (Palazzo Altemps); Via delle Botteghe Oscure, 31 (Crypta Balbi) all Rome, Italy
- Coordinates: 41°54′4.51″N 12°29′53.86″E
- Type: archaeology
- Director: Daniela Porro
- Website: Official website

The Museo Nazionale Romano (National Roman Museum) is a museum with several branches in separate buildings throughout the city of Rome, Italy. It shows exhibits from the pre- and early history of Rome, with a focus on archaeological findings from the period of Ancient Rome.

== History ==
Founded in 1889 and inaugurated in 1890, the museum's first aim was to collect and exhibit archaeologic materials unearthed during the excavations after the union of Rome with the Kingdom of Italy.

The initial core of its collection originated from the Kircherian Museum, an archaeological collection assembled by the antiquarian and Jesuit priest Athanasius Kircher, which had previously been housed within the Jesuit complex of Sant'Ignazio. The collection was appropriated by the state in 1874, after the suppression of the Society of Jesus. Renamed initially as the Royal Museum, the collection was intended to be moved to a Museo Tiberino (Tiberine Museum), which was never completed.

In 1901 the Italian state granted the National Roman Museum the recently acquired Ludovisi collection, as well as the important national collection of ancient sculpture. Findings during the urban renewal of the late 19th century added to the collections.

In 1913, a ministerial decree sanctioned the division of the collection of the Museo Kircheriano among all the different museums that had been established over the last decades, such as the Museo Nazionale Romano, the Museo Nazionale Etrusco at the Villa Giulia, and the Museum of Castel Sant'Angelo.

Its seat was established in the charterhouse designed and realised in the 16th century by Michelangelo within the Baths of Diocletian, which currently houses the epigraphic and the protohistoric sections of the modern museum, while the main collection of ancient art was moved to the nearby Palazzo Massimo alle Terme, acquired by the Italian state in 1981.

The reconversion of the area of the ancient bath/charterhouse into an exhibition space began on the occasion of the International Exhibition of Art of 1911; this effort was completed in the 1930s.

== Palazzo Massimo alle Terme ==
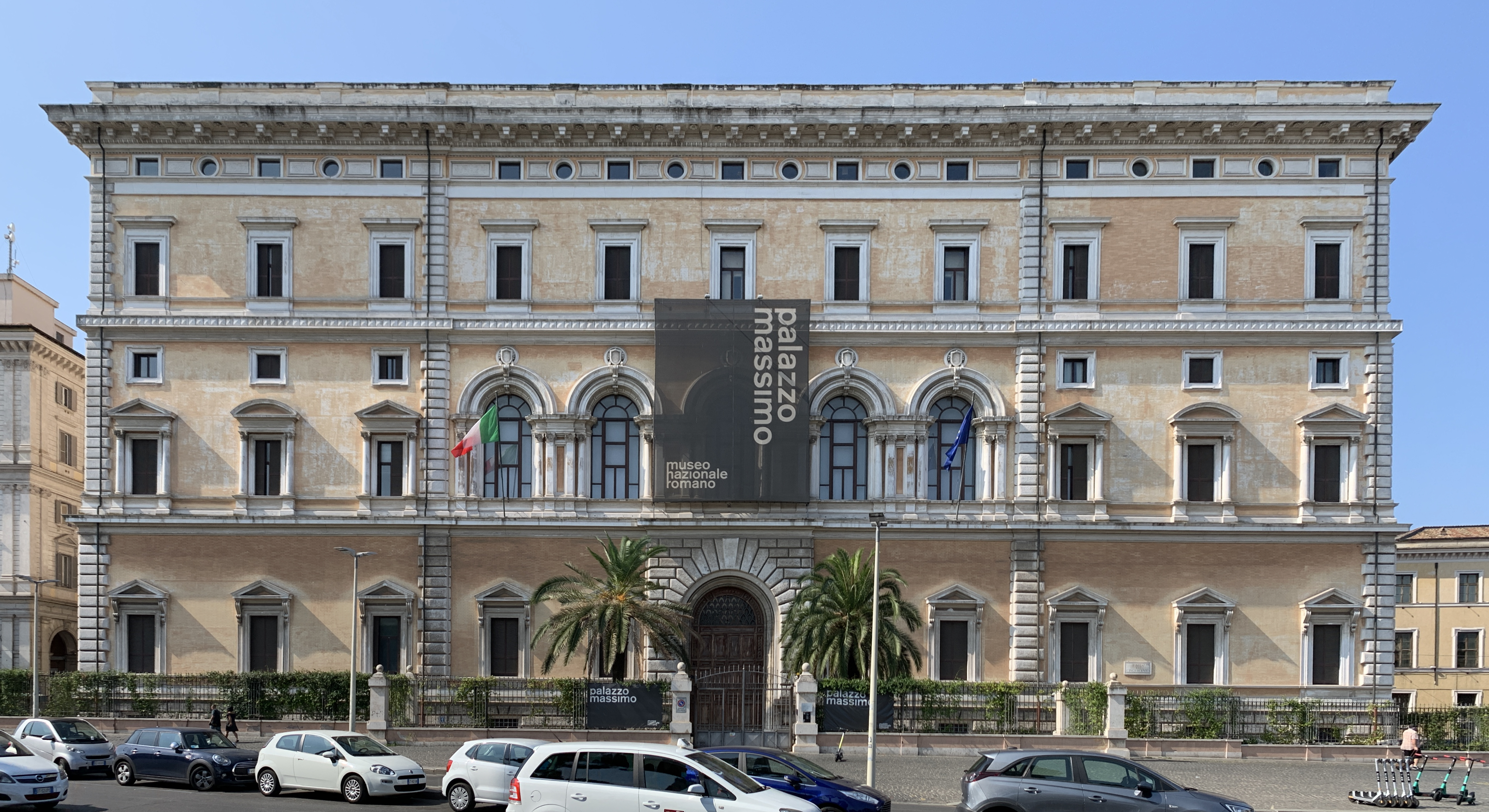
Palazzo Massimo alle Terme

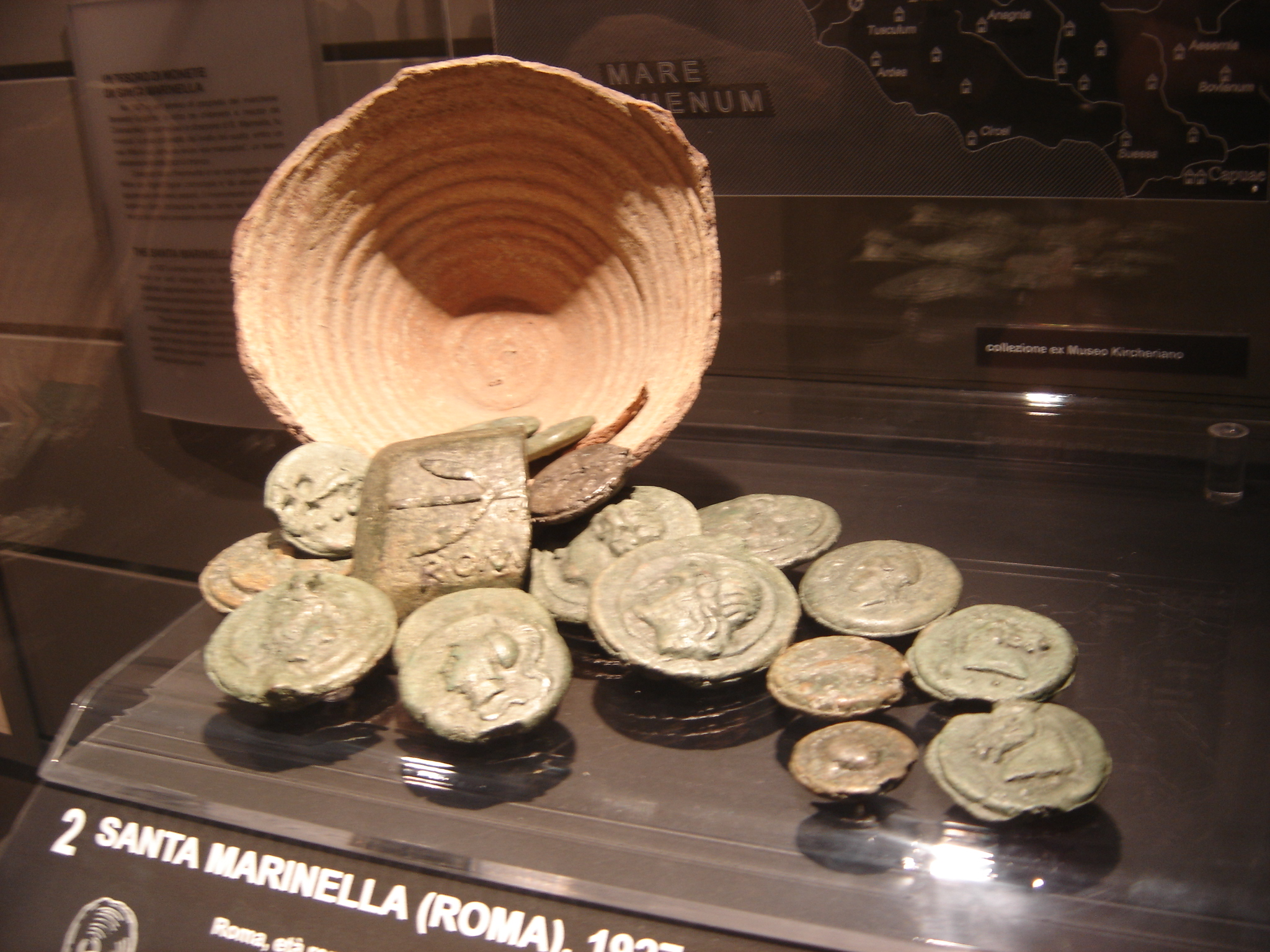
Coins on display in the basement of the Palazzo Massimo

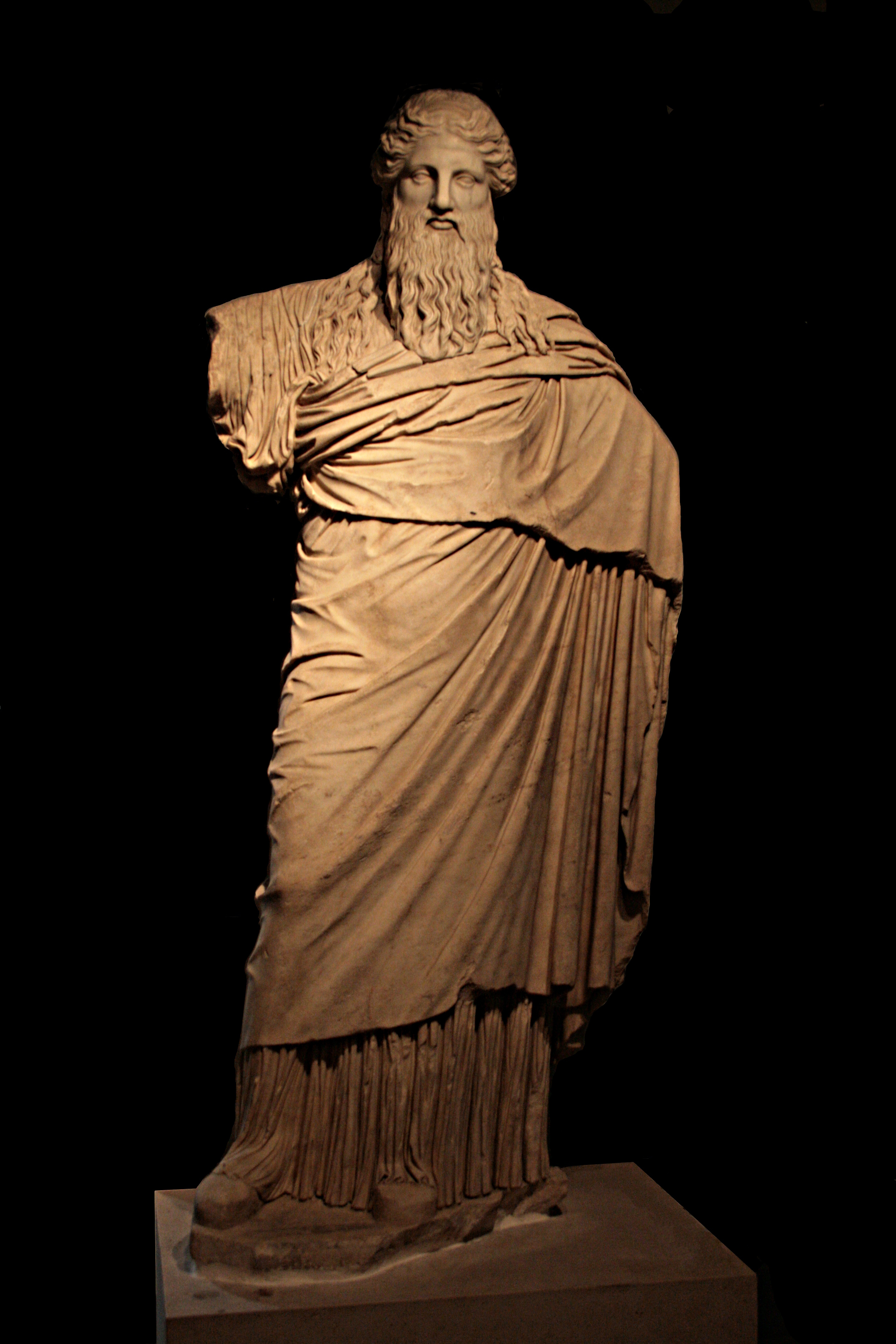
A Dionysus Sardanapalus from the Palazzo Massimo

=== History of the building ===
The palace was built on the site once occupied by the Villa Montalto-Peretti, named after Pope Sixtus V. The present building was commissioned by Prince Massimiliano Massimo, so as to give a seat to the Jesuit Roman College, originally within the convent of the Church of St. Ignatius of Loyola at Campus Martius. In 1871, the College had been ousted from the convent by the government which converted it into the Liceo Visconti, the first secular public high school of Italy. Erected between 1883 and 1887 by the architect Camillo Pistrucci in Neo-Renaissance style, it was one of the most prestigious schools of Rome until 1960. During World War II, it was partially used as a military hospital, but it then returned to scholastic functions after the war only until the 1960s, when the school was moved to a newer seat in the EUR quarter.

In 1981, when the palace was lying in a state of neglect and disrepair, the Italian Government acquired it for 19 billion lira and granted it to the National Roman Museum. Its restoration and adaptation began in 1983 and was completed in 1998. The palace eventually became the main seat of the museum as well as the headquarters of the Agency of the Ministry of Cultural Heritage and Activities of Italy (Italian: Soprintendenza Speciale per i Beni Archeologici di Roma), in charge for the archaeological heritage of Rome. The museum houses the ancient art (sculptures, paintings, mosaics and goldsmiths’ crafts from the Republican Age to the Late Antiquity) as well as the numismatic collection, housed in the Medagliere, i.e. the coin cabinet.

==== Ground floor and first floor ====
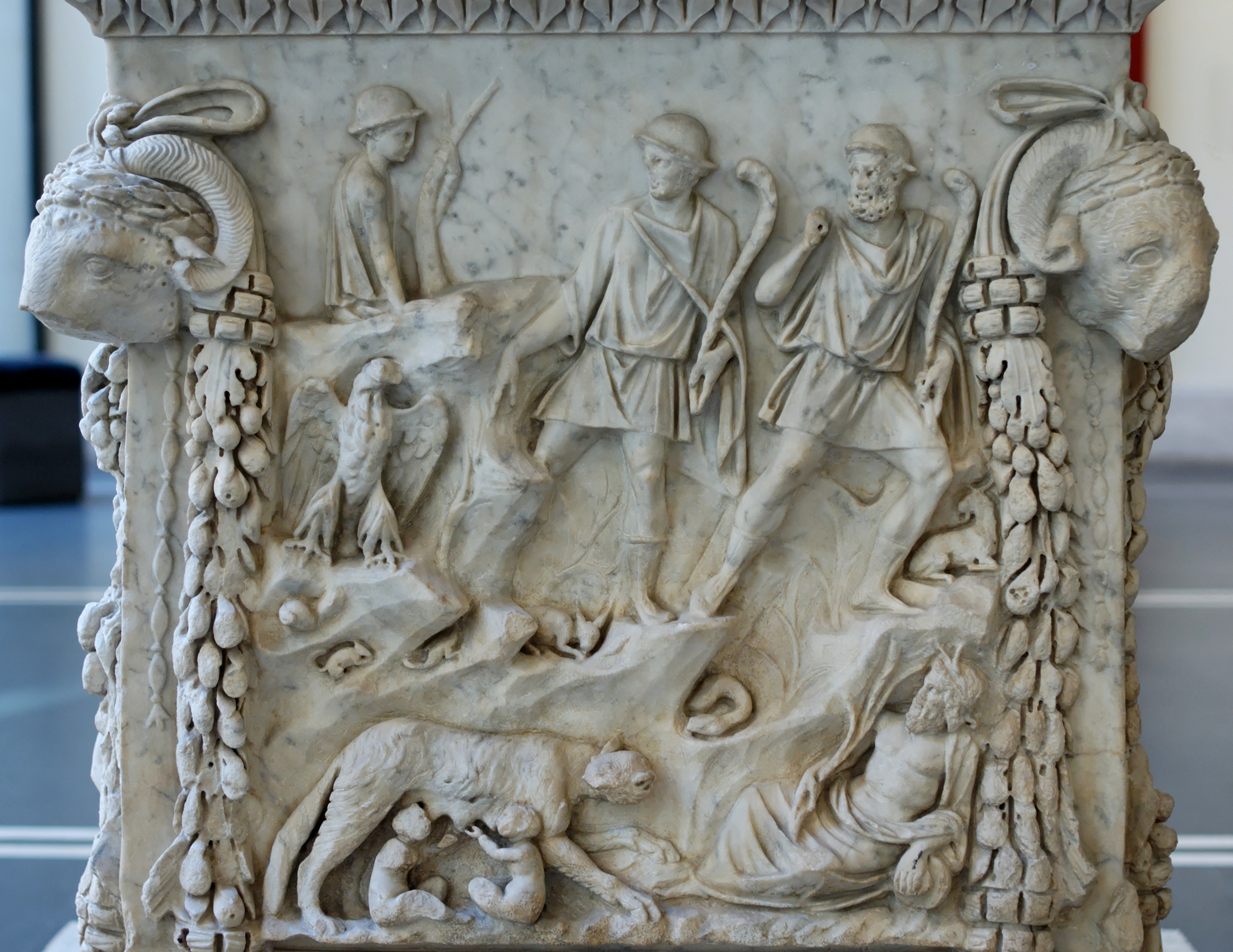
Altar of Romulus and Remus

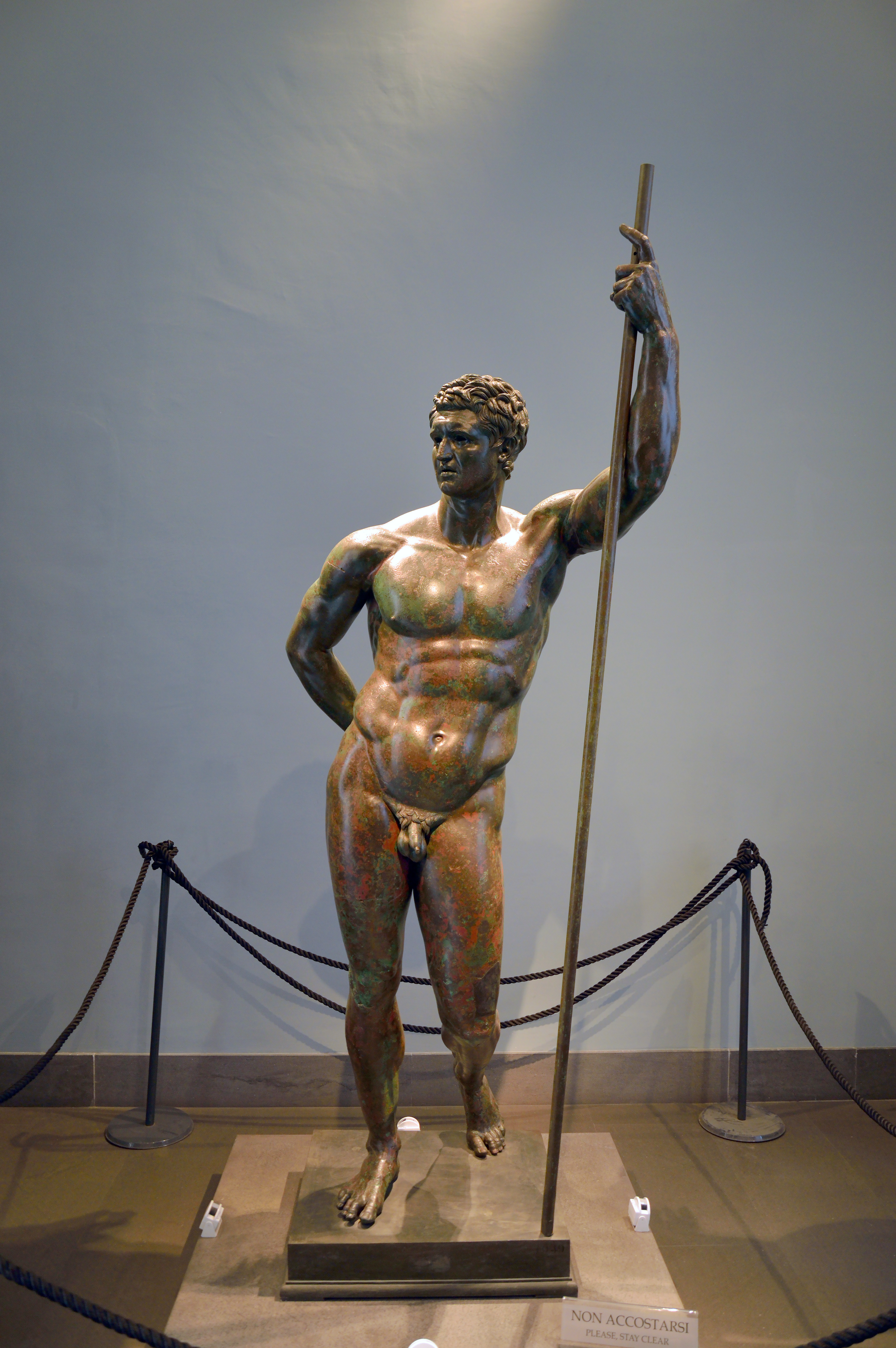
A Seleucid prince as hero

The ground floor features the notable bronze statues of the Boxer at Rest and the Athlete.

One room is devoted to the mummy that was found in 1964 on the Via Cassia, inside a richly decorated sarcophagus with several artefacts in amber and pieces of jewellery also on display. Sculptures of the period between the late Roman Republic and the early imperial period (2nd century BC to 1st century AD), include:

- Tivoli General
- Tiber Apollo
- Tiber Dionysus
- Via Labicana Augustus
- Aphrodite of Menophantos
- Hermes Ludovisi from Anzio
- Torlonia Vase
- Sleeping Hermaphroditus
- Dionysus Sardanapalus
- Portonaccio sarcophagus

==== Second floor ====
Frescoes, stuccoes and mosaics, including those from the villa of Livia, wife of Augustus, at Prima Porta on the Via Flaminia. It begins with the summer triclinium of Livia's Villa ad Gallinas Albas. The frescoes, discovered in 1863 and dating back to the 1st century BC, show a luscious garden with ornamental plants and pomegranate trees.

==== Basement ====
The Museum's numismatic collection is the largest in Italy. Among the coins on exhibit are Theodoric’s medallion, the four ducats of Pope Paul II with the navicella of Saint Peter, and the silver piastre of the Papal State with views of the city of Rome.

== Palazzo Altemps ==
=== History of the building ===
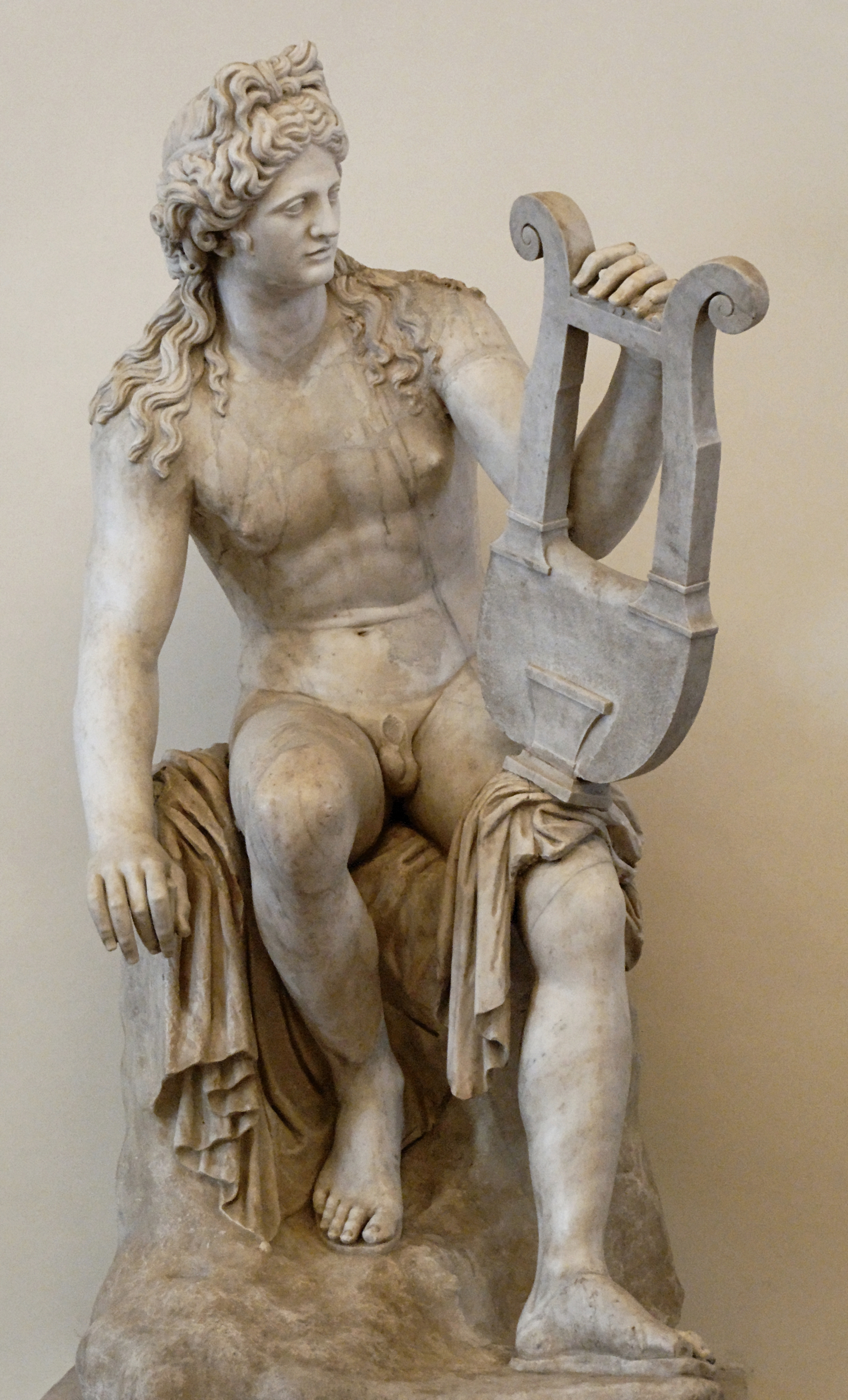
An Apollo Citharoedus from the Palazzo Altemps

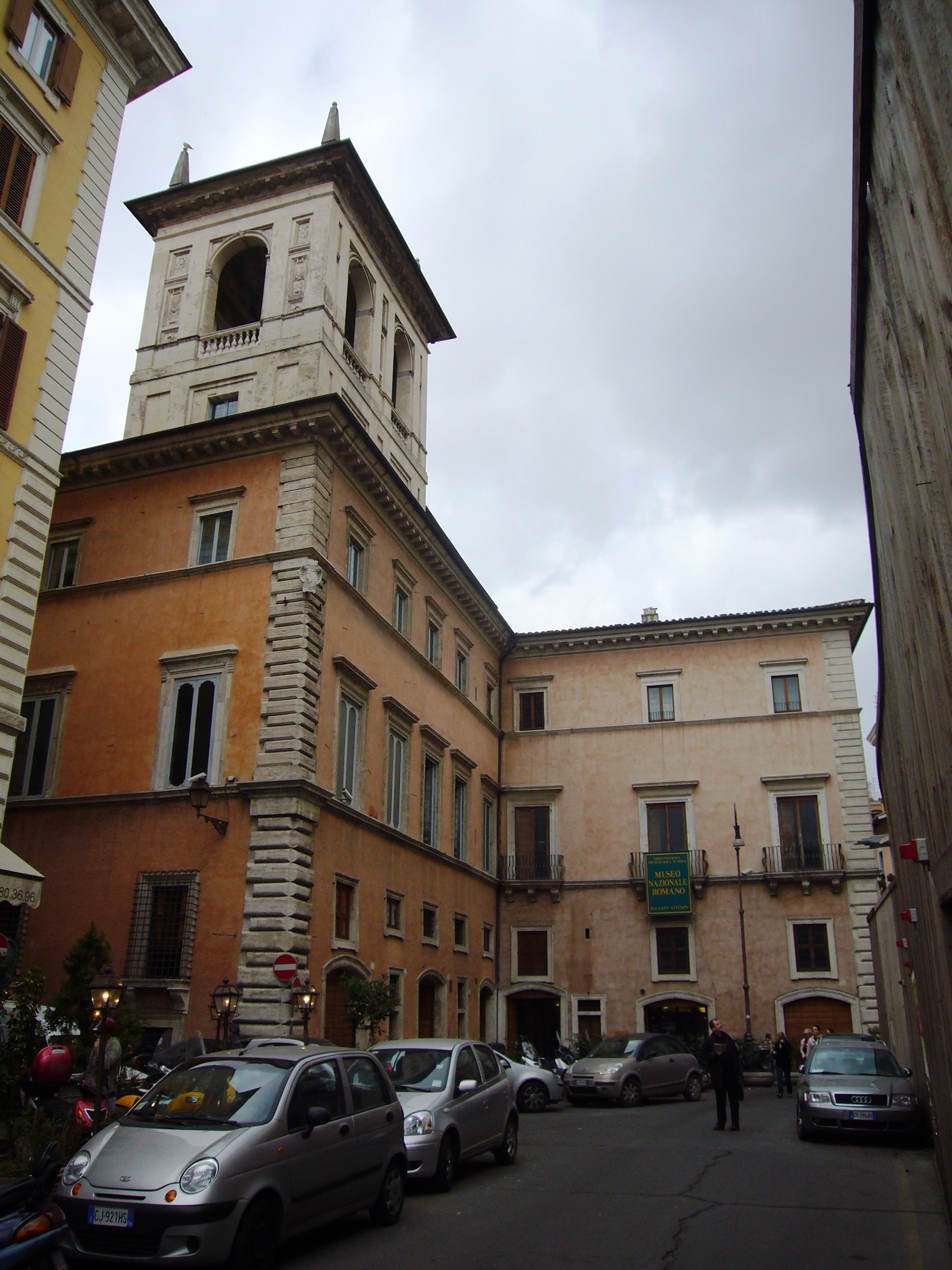
Exterior view of the Palazzo Altemps

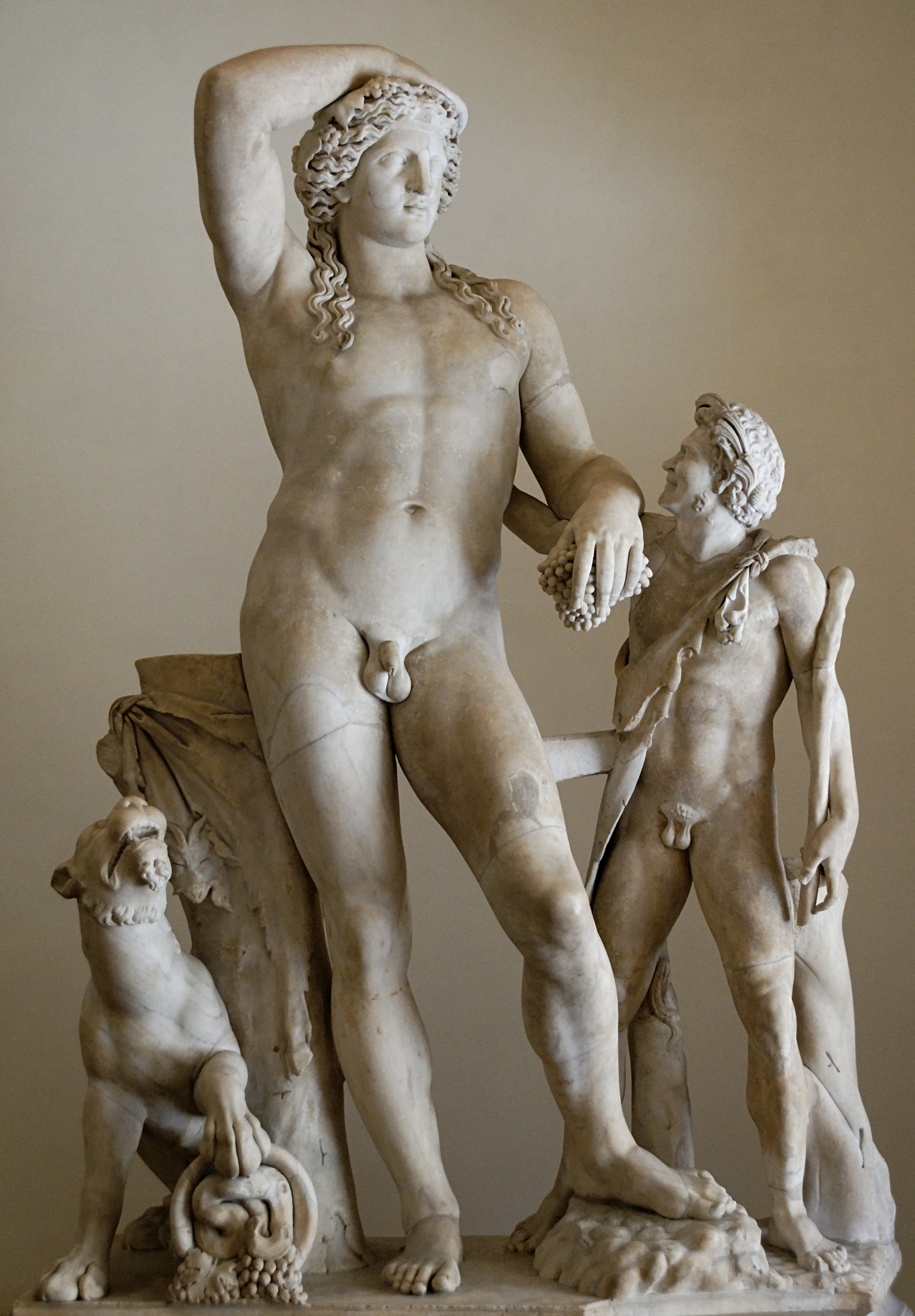
Dionysus with a panther and satyr, from the Palazzo Altemps

The building was designed in the 15th century by Melozzo da Forlì for Girolamo Riario, a relation of Pope Sixtus IV. There is still a fresco on one wall of the rooms in the palazzo that celebrates the wedding of Girolamo to Caterina Sforza in 1477, showing the silver plates and other wedding gifts given to the couple. When the Riario family began to decline after the death of Pope Sixtus IV, the palazzo was sold to Cardinal Francesco Soderini of Volterra, who commissioned further refinements from the architects Sangallo the Elder and Baldassare Peruzzi.

When the Soderini family fell on hard times, he in turn sold it in 1568 to the Austrian-born cardinal Mark Sittich von Hohenems Altemps, the son of the sister of Pope Pius IV. Cardinal Altemps commissioned the architect Martino Longhi to expand and improve the palazzo; it was Longhi who built the belvedere. Cardinal Altemps accumulated a large collection of books and ancient sculpture. Though his position as the second son in his family meant Marco Sittico Altemps became a cleric, he was not inclined to priesthood. His mistress bore him a son, Roberto, made Duke of Gallese. Roberto Altemps was executed for adultery in 1586 by Pope Sixtus V.

The Altemps family continued to mix in the circles of Italian nobility throughout the 17th century. Roberto's granddaughter Maria Cristina d'Altemps married Ippolito Lante Montefeltro della Rovere, Duke of Bomarzo.

The Palazzo Altemps became the property of the Holy See in the 19th century, and the building was used as a seminary for a short time. It was granted to the Italian state in 1982 and after 15 years of restoration, inaugurated as a museum in 1997.

=== Collections ===
The palazzo houses the museum's exhibits on the history of collecting (sculptures from Renaissance collections such as the Boncompagni-Ludovisi and Mattei collections, including the Ludovisi Ares, Ludovisi Throne, and the Suicide of a Gaul (from the same Pergamon group as the Dying Gaul) and the Egyptian collection (sculptures of eastern deities). The palace also includes the historic private theatre, at present used to house temporary exhibitions, and the church of Sant' Aniceto.

== Crypta Balbi ==
=== History of the building ===
In 1981, digging on a derelict site in the Campus Martius between the churches of Santa Caterina dei Funari and Santo Stanislao dei Polacchi, Daniel Manacorda and his team discovered the colonnaded quadriporticus of the Theatre of Lucius Cornelius Balbus, the nearby statio annonae and evidence of later, medieval occupation of the site. These are presented in this branch of the museum, inaugurated in 2001, which houses the archaeological remains and finds from that dig (including a stucco arch from the porticus).

=== Collections ===
As well as new material from the excavations, objects in this exhibition space come from

- the collections of the former Kircherian Museum
- the Gorga and Betti collections
- numismatic material from the Gnecchi collections and the collection of Victor Emmanuel III of Savoy
- collections from the Roman Forum, in particular a fresco and marble architrave from the late-1930s Fascist deconstruction of the medieval church of Sant'Adriano in the Curia senatus.
- Museum of the Palazzo Venezia
- the Capitoline Museums
- the communal Antiquarium of Rome
- frescoes removed in 1960 from the church of Santa Maria in Via Lata.

==== Basement ====
The building's basement contains archaeological remains. Access is only by guided tour.

==== Ground floor ====
The first section ("archaeology and history of an urban landscape") presents the results of the excavations, and puts them in the context of the history of the area. As well as showing the remains from the site itself, this section also tells of the Monastero di Santa Maria Domine Rose (begun nearby in the 8th century), of medieval merchants' and craftsmen's homes, of the Conservatorio di Santa Caterina dei Funari (built in the mid-16th century by Ignatius of Loyola to house the daughters of Roman prostitutes) and of the Botteghe Oscure.

==== First floor ====
A second section ("Rome from Antiquity to the Middle Ages") is the Museum of Medieval Rome and illustrates the life and transformation of Rome between the 5th and 10th centuries AD.

== Baths of Diocletian ==
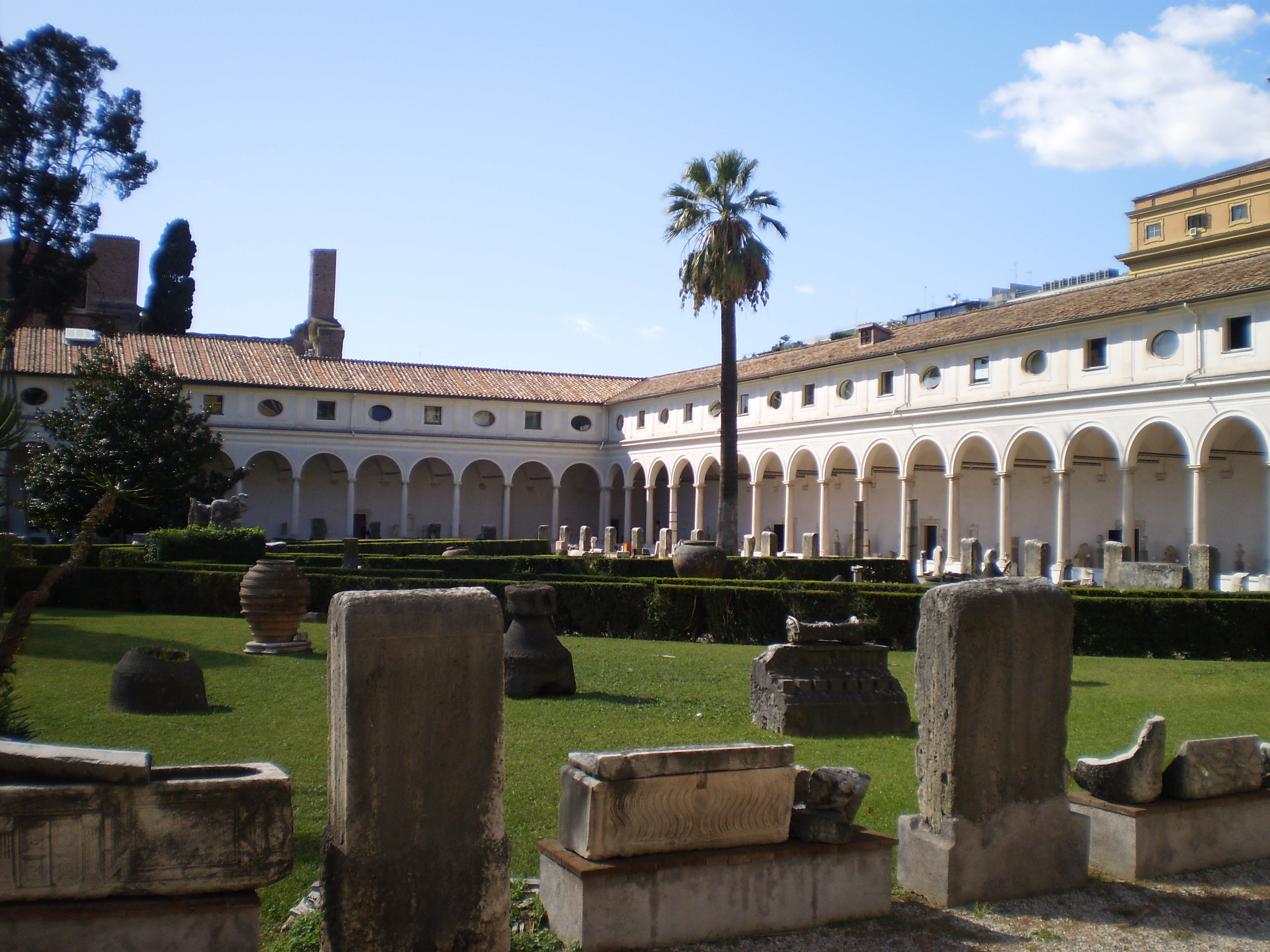
Michelangelo's Cloister

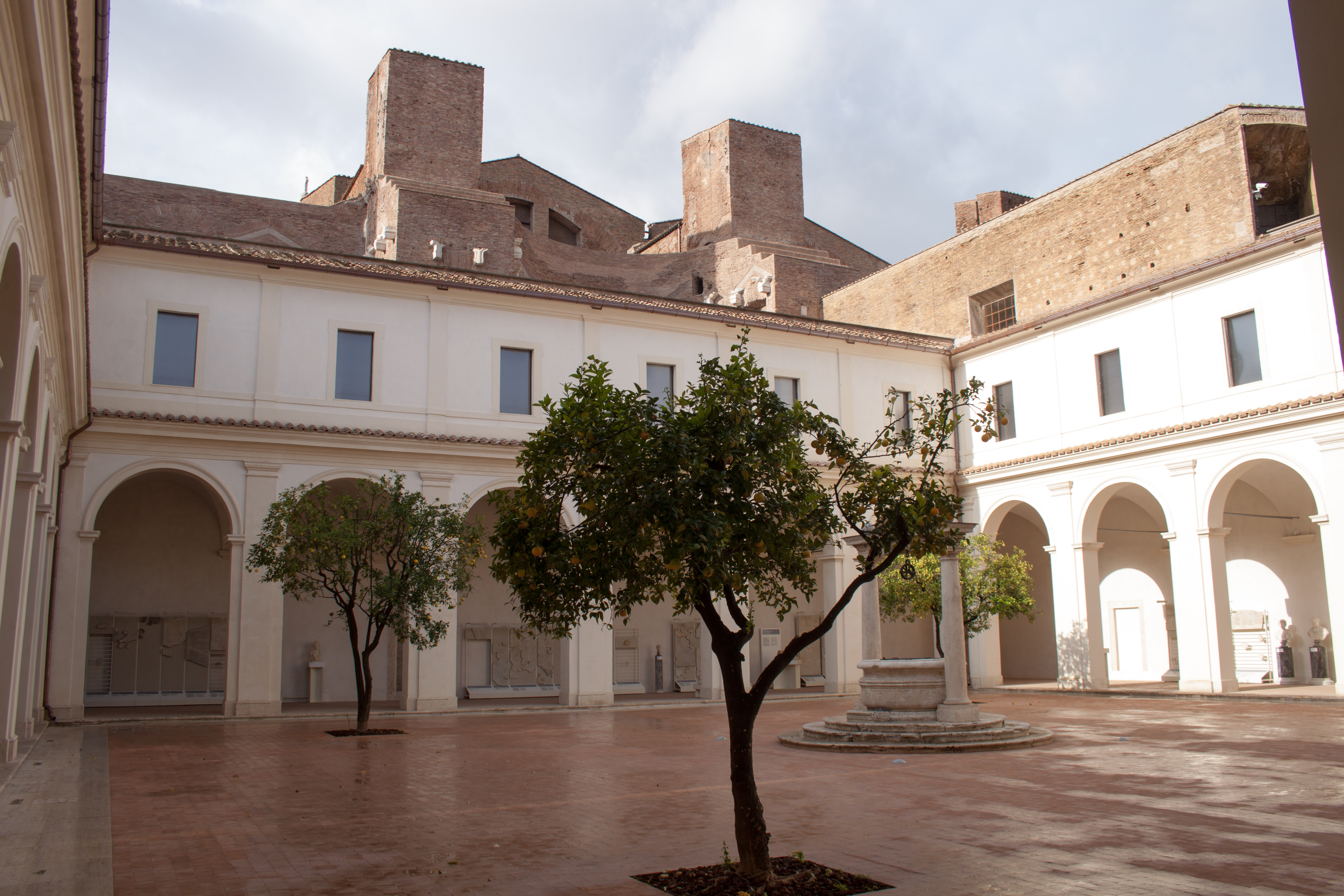
Small cloister

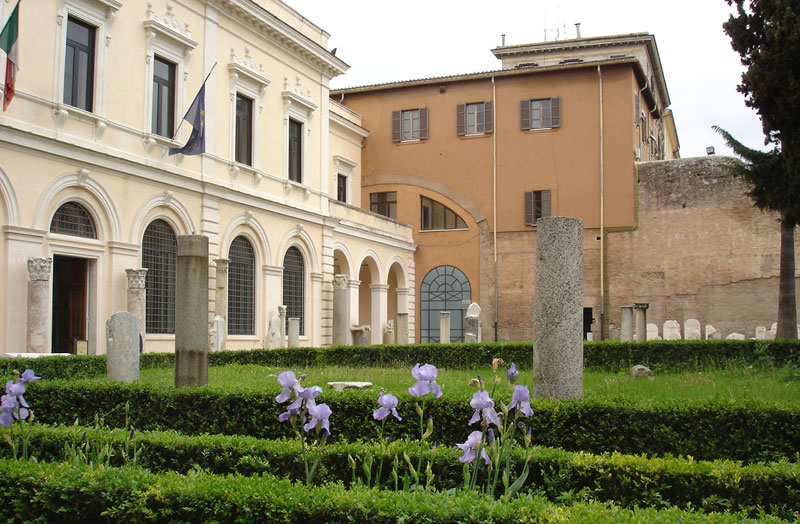
The garden in front of the seat of the branch of the Museum housed at the Baths of Diocletian

=== Cloister of Michelangelo ===
The cloister of the charterhouse of the church of Santa Maria degli Angeli e dei Martiri, this is often referred to as "Michelangelo's Cloister" as he was tasked by the Pope with transforming the Baths into a church and chapterhouse. However, it is more likely that Michelangelo just came up with the layout and that a pupil of his, Giacomo del Duca, was responsible for most of the actual architecture, at least in the initial phase of construction. The cloister was built only after Michelangelo's death in 1564. Construction began in 1565 but took at least until 1600. The upper floor was finished in 1676 and the central fountain dates to 1695.

Inside the square of the cloister, a 16th-century garden features outdoor displays of altars and funerary sculpture and inscriptions. These notably include some colossal animal heads, several of which date from Antiquity and were found near Trajan's Column in 1586.

=== Prehistory section ===
On the upper floor of the cloister, this exhibit shows the development of the culture of Latium from the Bronze Age (11th century BC) to the Orientalizing Period (10th to 6th century BC) by means of archaeological findings from the region around Rome.

=== Small cloister ===
The small cloister of the charterhouse has been recently renovated. It occupies around a third of the area previously occupied by the natatio (swimming pool) of the Baths of Diocletian. It was originally built alongside the church. Construction began in the mid-16th century but continued beyond the 17th century. With a side length of 40 meters (half the size of Michelangelo's Cloister) it today features exhibits on the Arval Brethren and on the Secular Games. The late 16th-century travertine well in the centre was added during the recent renovation.

=== Epigraphic section ===
Showing over 900 exhibits on inscriptions/writings, over three floors of a modern building, this collection houses over 10,000 inscriptions. Among the items displayed is the Zoninus collar.

=== Aule delle Olearie ===
These were the storage facilities created by Pope Clement XIII in some of the former halls of the Baths of Diocletian. These large halls (numbered I to XI), most of them without roof cover, have been part of the museum since 1911.

=== Aula of Saint Isidore ===
A small square room built next to a granary known Annona in 1640. In 1754 it was converted into a chapel dedicated to Saint Isidore.

=== Octagonal Aula ===
This was part of the central complex of the Baths of Diocletian. It was the last of the four halls next to the caldarium. It was converted into a grain store in 1575, and in 1764 became a storage facility for oil. The dome is still the original one. The hall served as an exhibition site in 1911 but was then turned into a cinema and, in 1928, into a planetarium.

The hall was restored in 1991. It is devoted to sculptures found on baths sites in Rome.

== Gallery ==
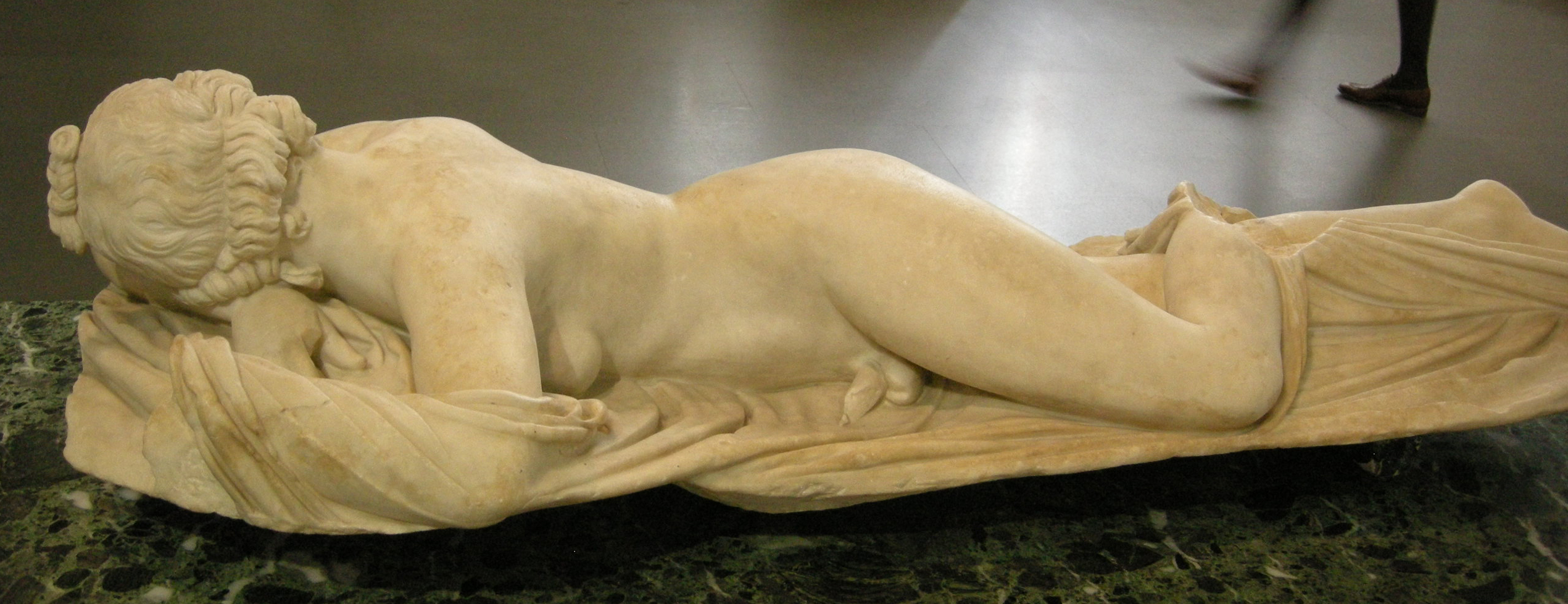
Sleeping Hermaphroditus. Marble. National Roman Museum. 2nd century BCE
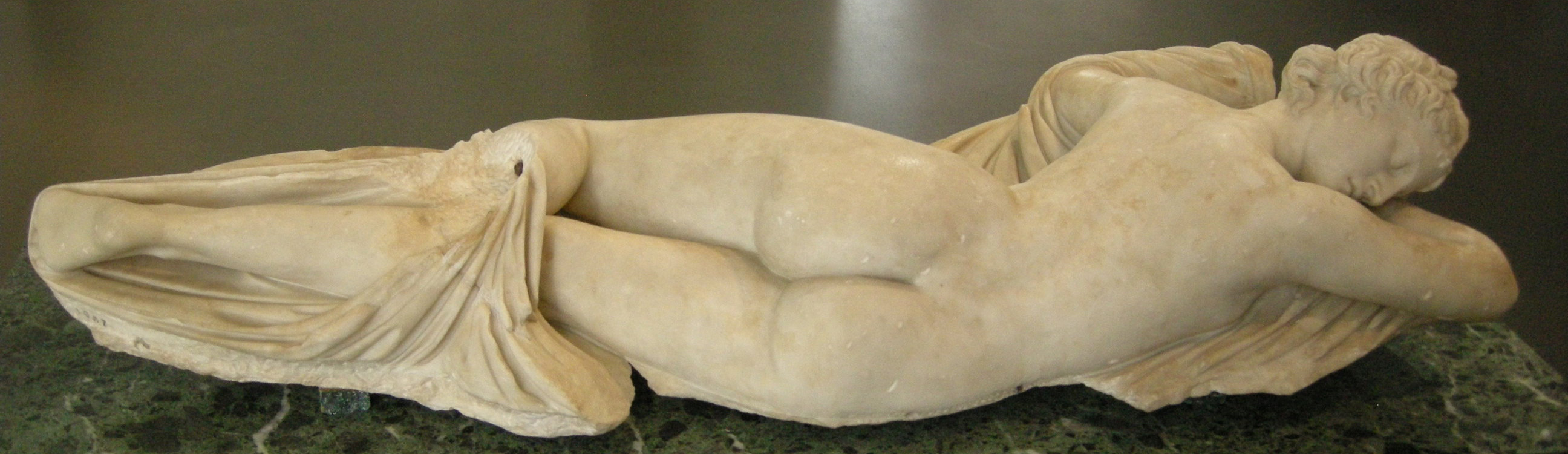
Sleeping Hermaphroditus, front view. Marble. National Roman Museum. 2nd century BCE
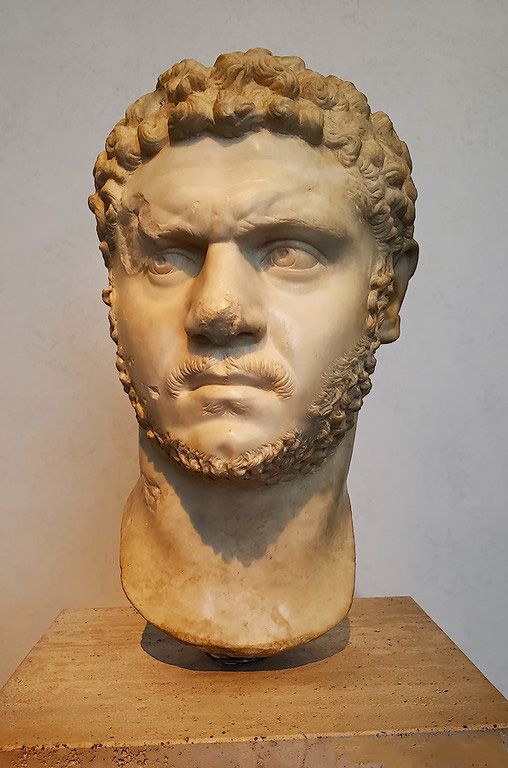
Bust of Emperor Caracalla

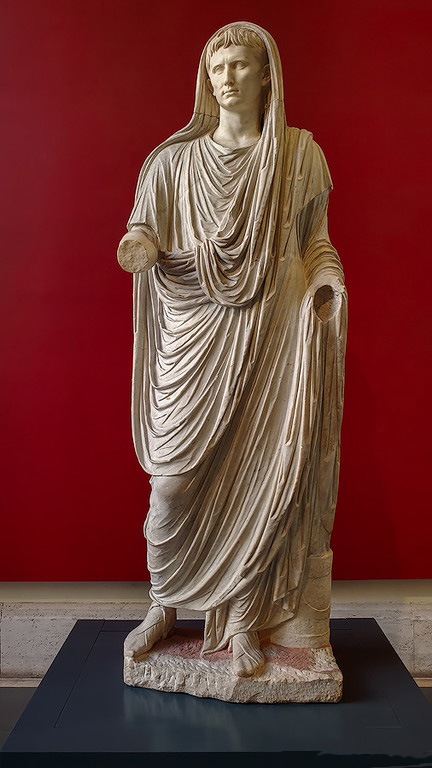
Emperor Augustus as Pontifex Maximus

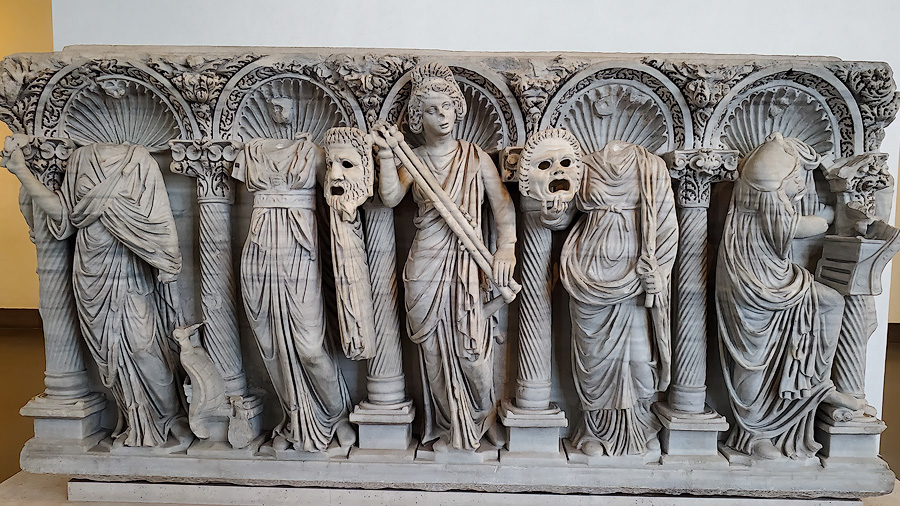
Sarcophagus with Muses

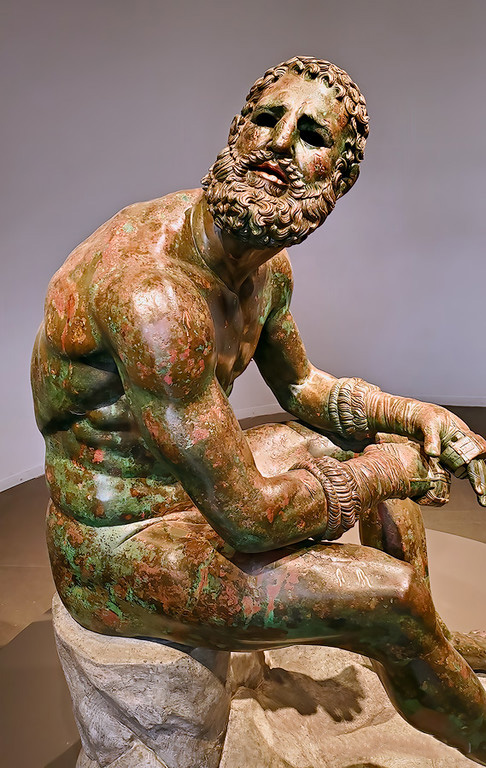
Bronze statue of a boxer resting after a bout

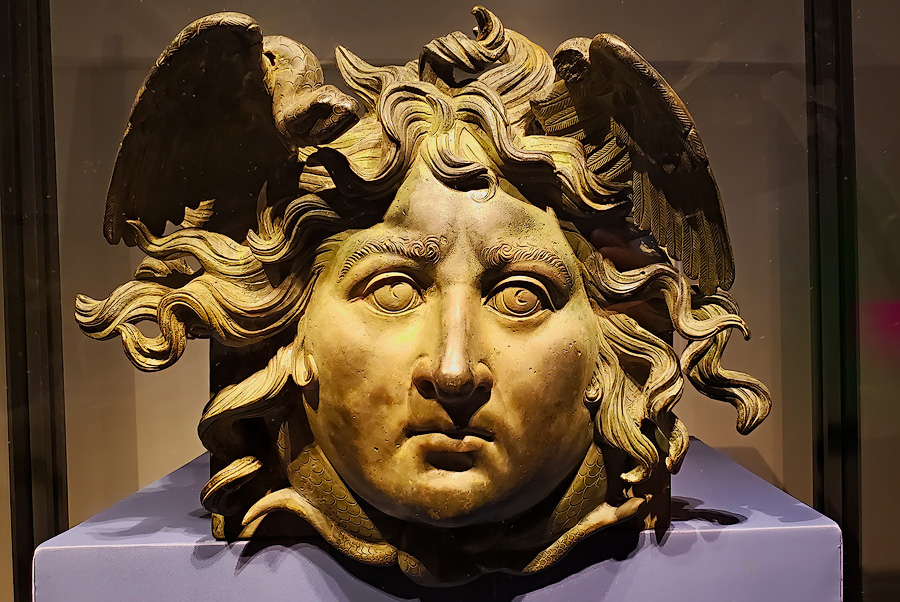
Head of Medusa in bronze

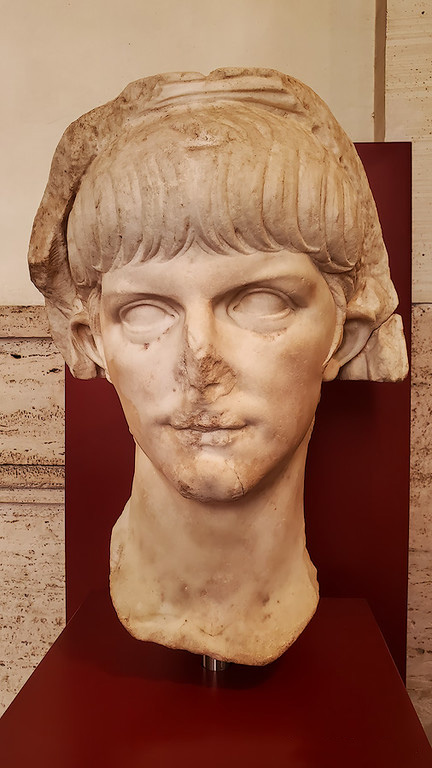
Bust of Emperor Nero at the Palazzo Massimo

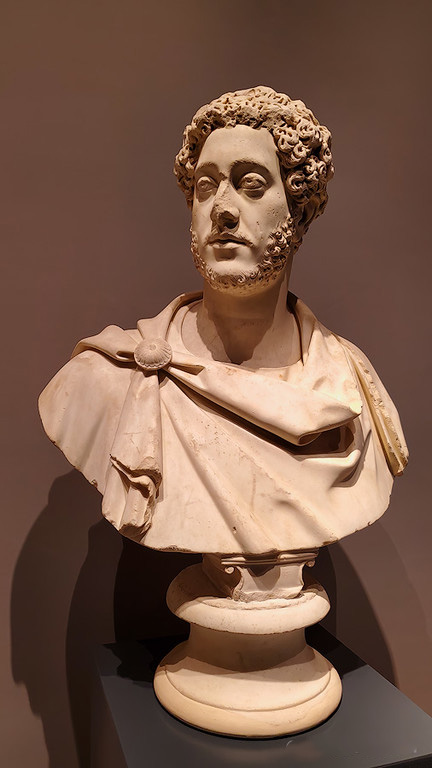
Emperor Comodus

Villa of Livia garden fresco

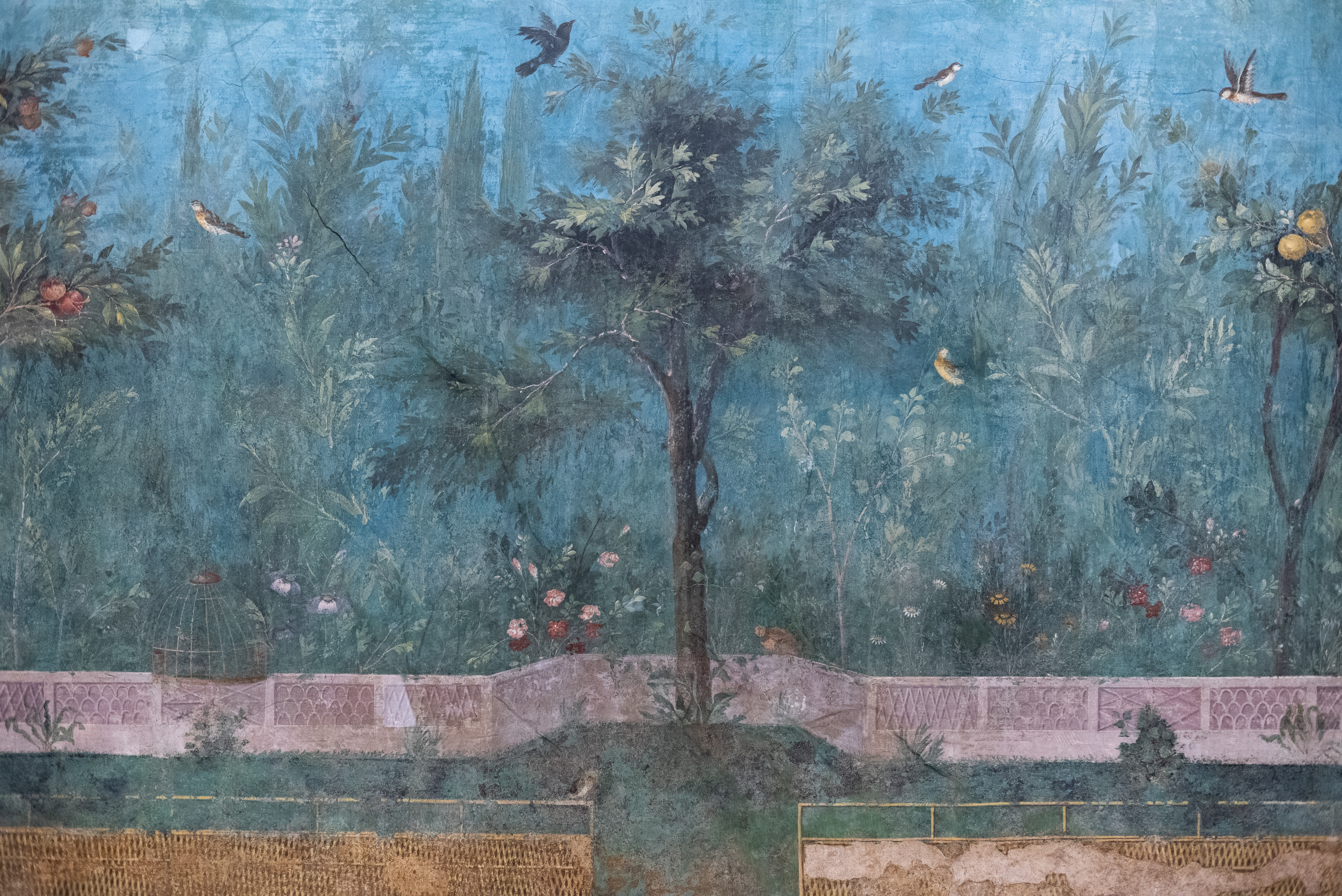
Villa of Livia garden fresco

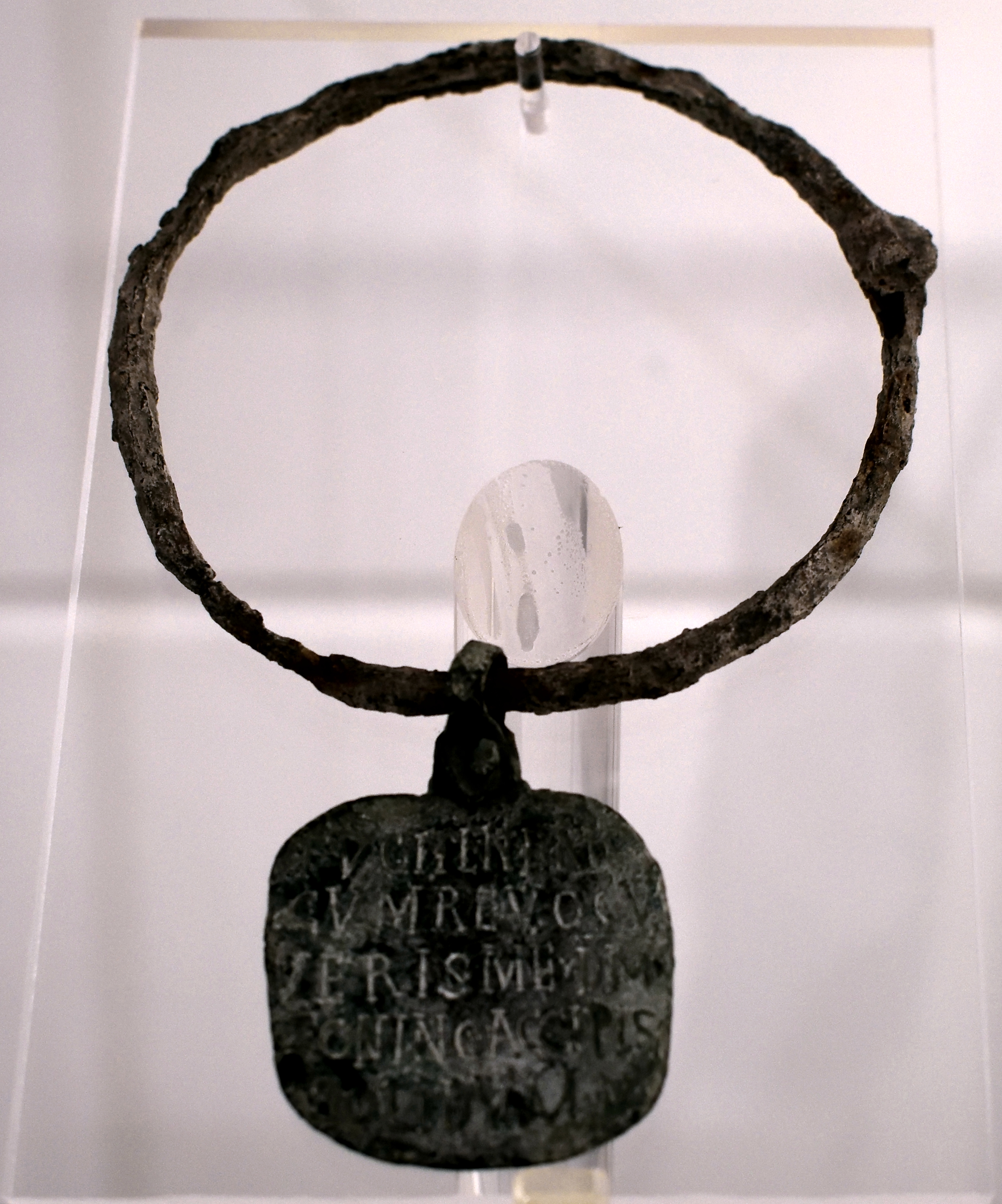
Zoninus collar

== See also ==
- List of Jesuit sites
