= Tiber Apollo =

Marble sculpture of Apollo recovered from the Tiber River

The Tiber Apollo
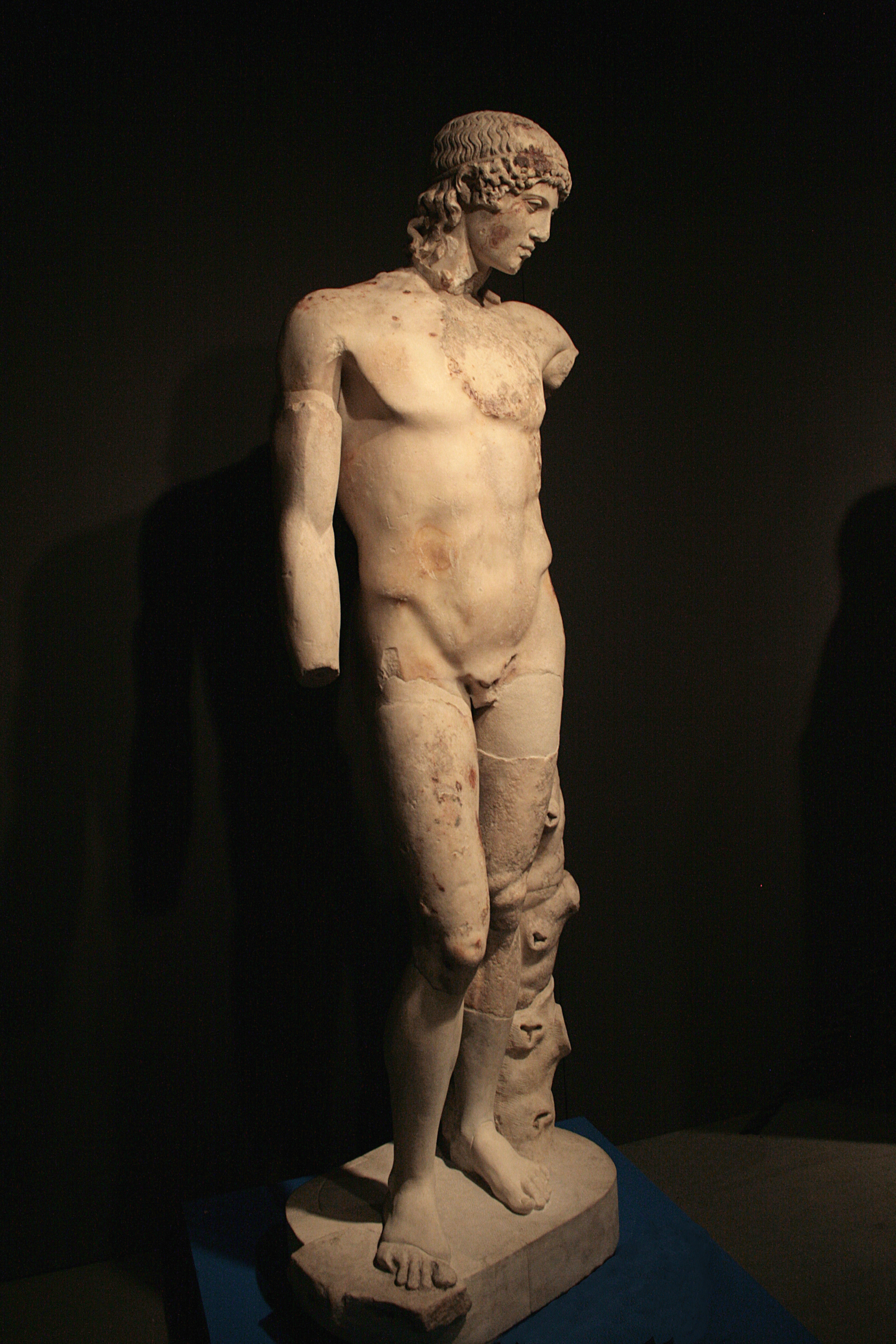
- Material: Marble
- Height: 2.04 meters
- Created: 1st century CE; presumably a copy from 450 BC
- Discovered: 1891; Ponte Garibaldi, Rome, Italy
- Present location: Museo Nazionale Romano
- Culture: Roman

The Tiber Apollo is an over lifesize marble sculpture of Apollo, a Hadrianic or Antonine Roman marble copy after a bronze Greek original of about 450 BCE. Dredged from the bed of the Tiber in Rome, in making piers for the Ponte Garibaldi (1885, bridge completed 1888).

Found in multiple fragments at the bottom of the river in the Tiber in Rome between the Palatine bridge and the so-called Bagni di Doma Olimpia.

It is conserved in the Museo Nazionale Romano in Palazzo Massimo alle Terme, Rome.

== Description ==
A small trace of the bow once held in the right hand remains visible above the right knee. This attribute helps to identify the figure as Apollo. The gaze was clearly turned towards some object once held in the left hand.

The style of the sculpture reflects the school of Phidias, perhaps the young Phidias himself, as Jiří Frel suggested, and Kenneth Clark observed of it, "If only this figure, instead of the Apollo Belvedere, had been known to Winckelmann, his insight and beautiful gift of literary re-creation would have been better supported by the sculptural qualities of his subject." Of this marble Brian A. Sparkes reminds us that "the general effect of copies always tends towards sweetness, and so it is here."

The figure, with his girlish curls, may once have held the laurel branch and bow, as he is not a citharoedus. The pensive reserve of such Apollos provided the iconographical type for Hadrianic portrait heads of Antinous in the following century. As a patron of the arts, many of the Hadrianic and Nerva–Antonine sculptures sought a softer, more relaxed form of masculinity.

Though it is missing its hand and left arms, the posture of the head and angled shoulder suggests that Apollo was holding something, whether it is a laurel branch or bow.

A copy was formerly in the Villa Borghese gardens.

== Examples of type ==
The group of sculptures of the Apollo Tiber type has been supposed by many scholars to derive from a bronze original statue to Pheidias, and by others to Calamis. Some scholars consider the type to be a classicizing one of Augustan origin.

Exist 7 replicas, comprising three marble statues, two heads and two bronze statuettes of Tiber Apollo type:

- Tiber Apollo himself
- Cherchel Apollo. Version recovered in 1910 among the ruins of Cherchel, Algeria, the Roman Caesarea Mauretaniae. Cherchel Museum. AD 130-150.
- Ex Villa Borghese Apollo Tiber type. Location unknown
- Capitoline head of Apollo Tiber type. Rome, Museo Capitolino. Ivv. 648. Julio-Claudian period. Combined with body of Kassel Apollo.
- Paris statuette of Apollo Tuber type. Louvre. Bronze. From the Este and Pourtales Collection
- Terme statuette head of Apollo Tuber type. Marble, AD 14-54. Rome, Museo Nazionale, inv. 40090.
- Vienna statuette head of Apollo Tuber type. Bronze. Vienna, Antikensammlung, VI 2848.
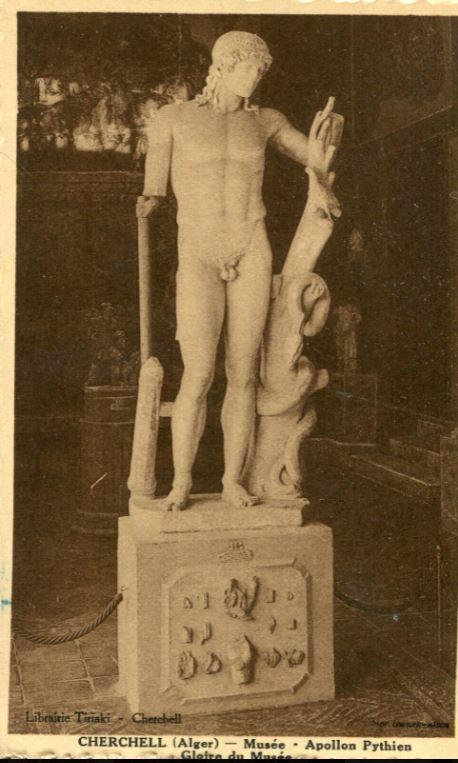
Cherchell Apollo

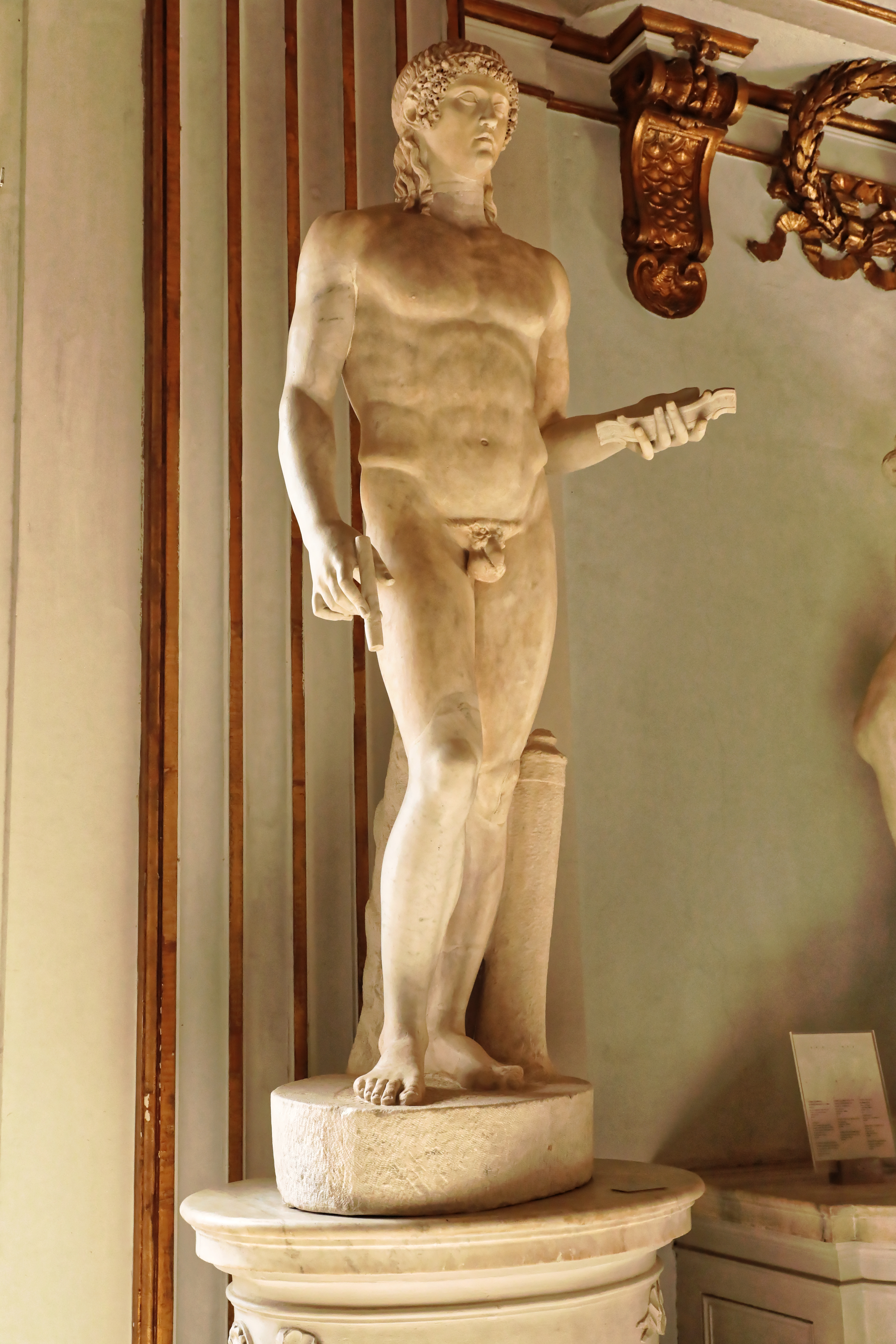
Apollo in Capitoline museum (combined)

== See also ==
- Tiber Dionysus - a life-sized bronze sculpture of Dionysus discovered 6 years earlier in 1885 during construction work on the Ponte Garibaldi

== Bibliography ==
- Michon, E. (1916-18) L' Apollon de Cherchel. MonPiot XXII, 55-70, pls. 7-9.
