= Tiber Dionysus =

Bronze sculpture of the god Dionysus

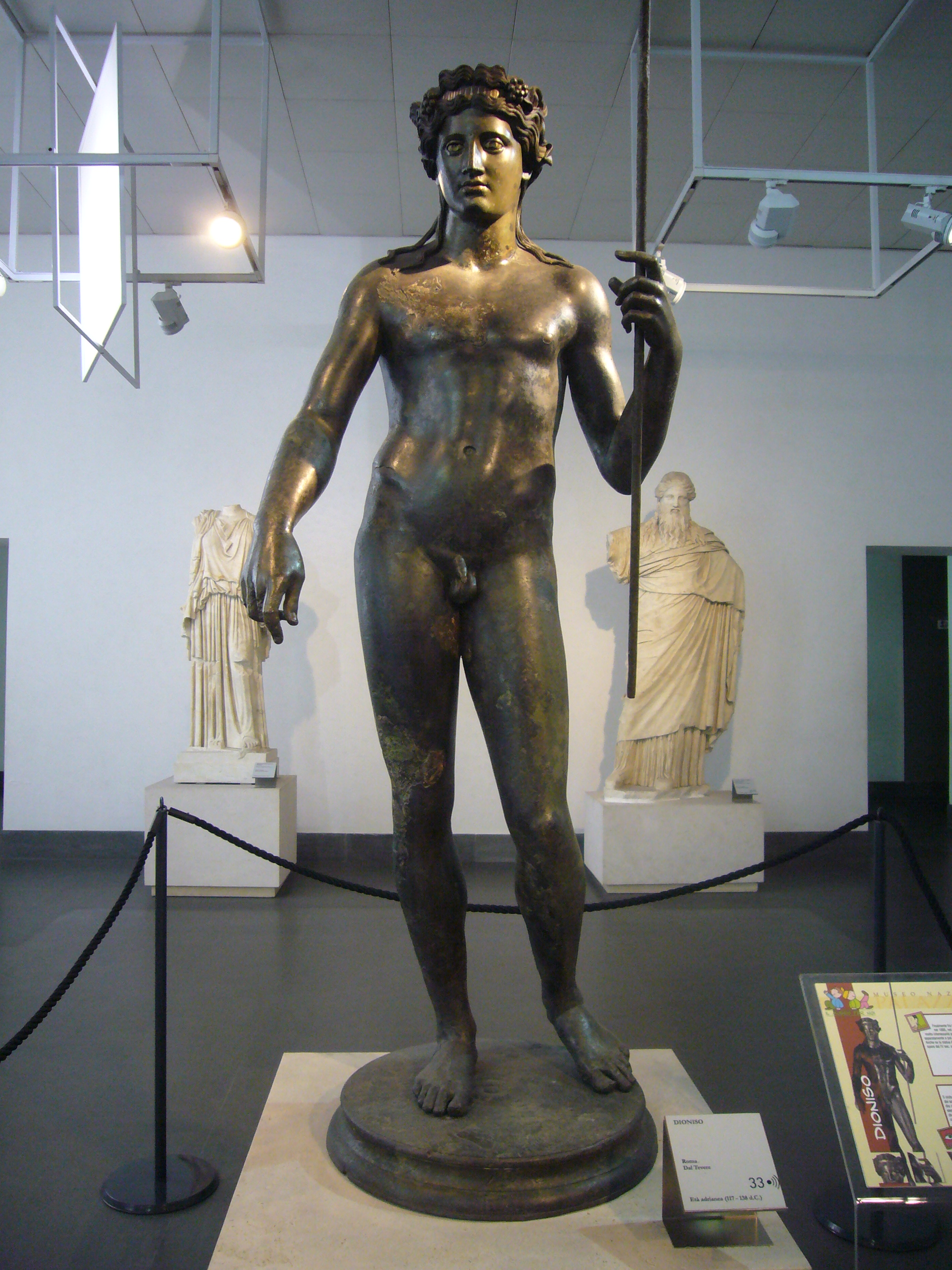

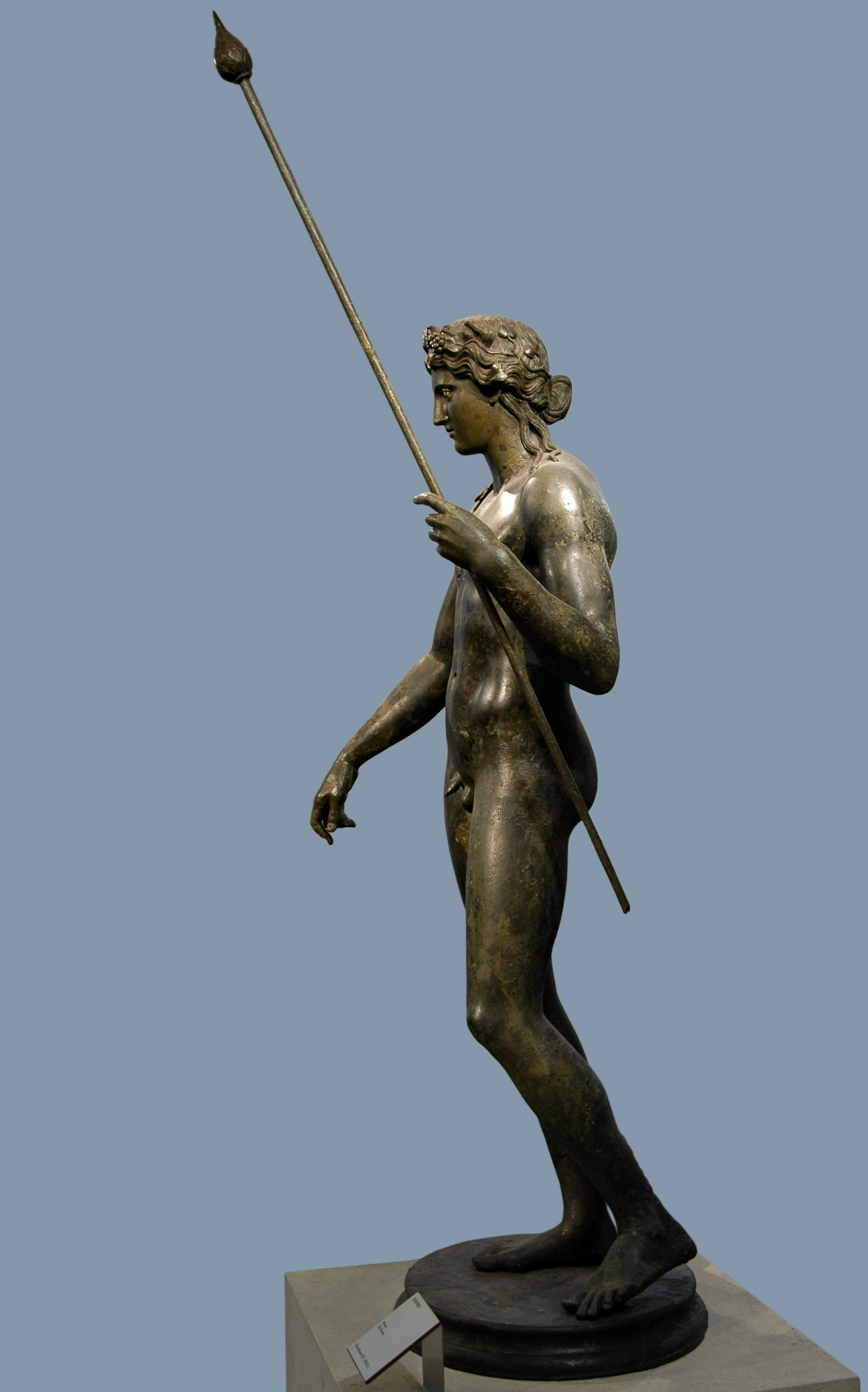
- Material: Bronze
- Height: 1.58 meters
- Period/culture: Roman, reign of Hadrian (117-138 AD)
- Discovered: 1885; Ponte Garibaldi, Rome, Italy
- Present location: Museo Nazionale Romano
- Culture: Roman

The Tiber Dionysus is a life-sized Bronze sculpture of the god Dionysus, cast in the lost wax technique.

It was discovered in 1885, during the construction of the Ponte Garibaldi during dredging along the Tiber. The bridge itself was dedicated to Giuseppe Garibaldi, considered the father of Italian Unification, and was designed by architect Angelo Vescovali. The Tiber Apollo would soon be discovered close by during further dredging in 1891.

Restored in 1984-1985, with the removal of stucco finishings made shortly after discovery around its legs, it is now currently on display at the National Roman Museum of Palazzo Massimo, under inventory number 1060.

== Description ==
Dionysus is depicted as a youth, standing on his right leg, the left bending backward, and his head turned slightly at a right angle. His long hair, slightly wavy, locks falling on each side rests on his shoulders. The hair is held in place with a headband colored red, white and blue, and adorned with ivy twigs, and grapes. He is seen holding a thyrsus.

It is believed that the statue has a blend of influences from various Greek sculptures, in particular to that of Polykleitos and Praxiteles.

According to classical archaeology professor Paul Zanker, Dionysus is modelled after the "Stephanos Athlete" statue, which is known for its long wavy hair, and that the eyes of the sculpture is a typical style to Hadrianic or Antonine style art, which utilizes a blend of various styles from different eras.
