= Lungotevere De' Cenci =

Coordinates: 41.8918°N 12.4771°E

- Interactive map of Lungotevere De' Cenci
- Namesake: Cenci family
- Location: Rome, Italy
- Quarter: Sant'Angelo and Regola
- From: Ponte Garibaldi
- To: Ponte Fabricio

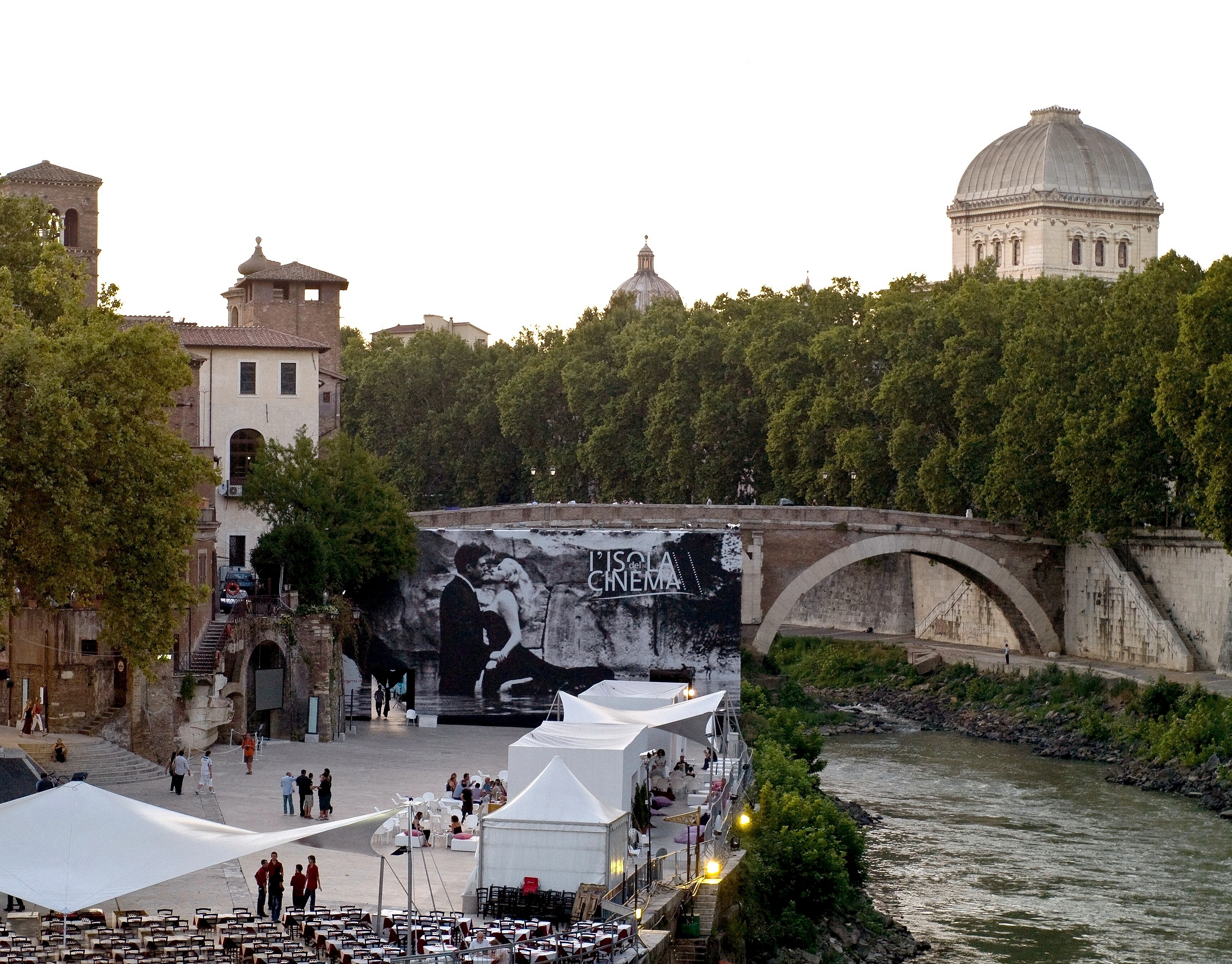
The lungotevere seen from Tiber Island

Lungotevere De' Cenci is the stretch of Lungotevere that connects Ponte Garibaldi to the Ponte Fabricio, in Rome, in the rioni Sant'Angelo and Regola.

The lungotevere is named after the family of the Cenci, protagonist of a tragic story of Renaissance Rome.

It is located between the Capitoline Hill and the Tiber Island; among its main landmarks, there are the modern Synagogue of Rome, to which is attached the museum of the Jewish community of Rome; at the corner of Via del Tempio lies the Villino Astengo, built in 1914 in Art Nouveau style. Its designer was Ezio Garroni, the villino's decorations are by Giuseppe Zina.

== Bibliography ==
- Rendina, Claudio; Paradisi, Donatella (2004). Le strade di Roma. First volume A-D. Rome: Newton Compton Editori. ISBN 88-541-0208-3.
