= Dionysus Sardanapalus =

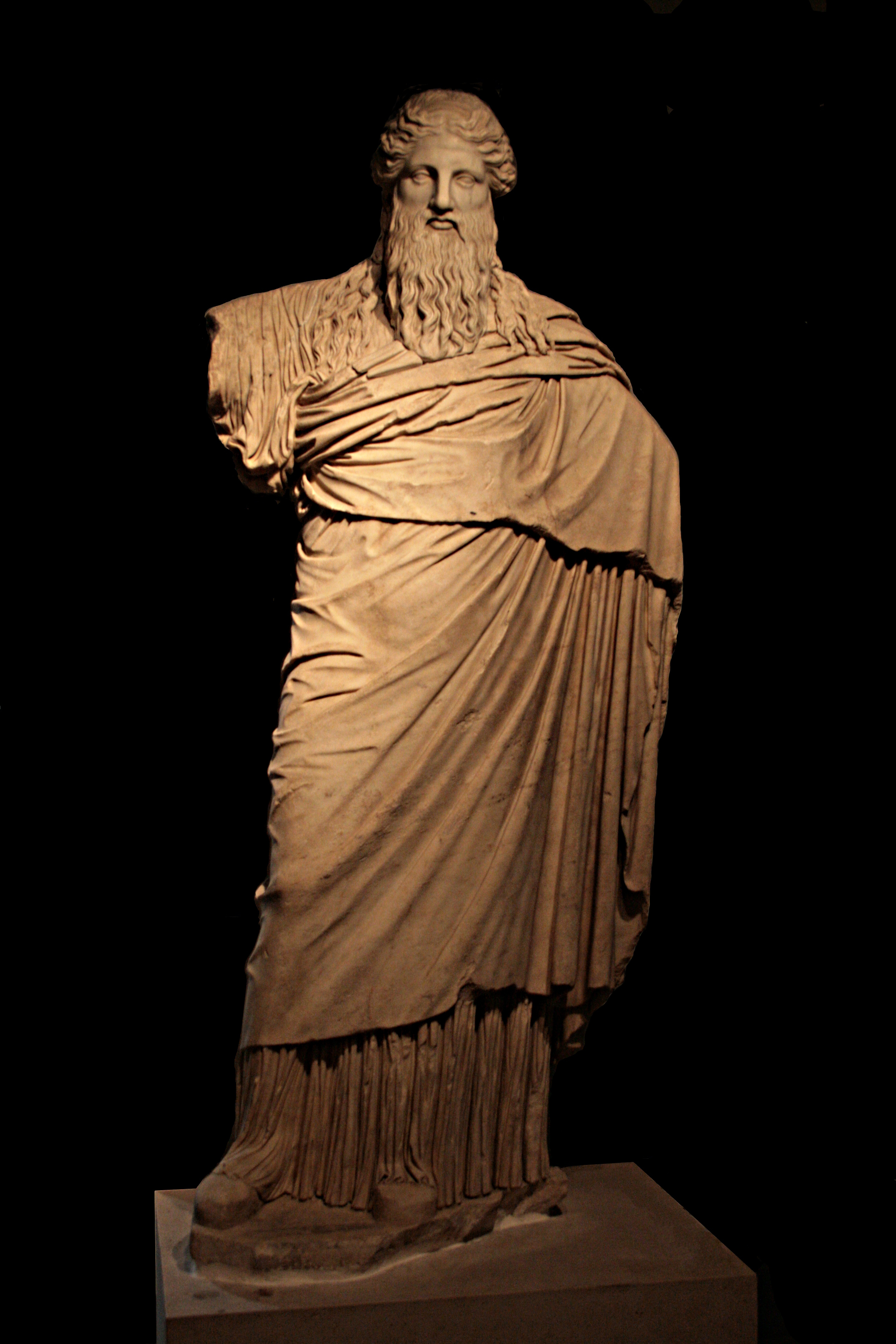
Dionysus Sardanaplus from the National Roman Museum of Palazzo Massimo

The Dionysus Sardanapalus is a Hellenistic-Roman Neo Attic sculpture-type of the god Dionysus, misnamed after the king Sardanapalus. Unlike many contemporary figurations of Dionysus as a lithe youth, the self-consciously archaising god is heavily draped, with an ivy wreath and a long archaic-style beard; probably he bore a thyrsos in a raised right hand, now missing.

The misidentification with Sardanapalus was erroneously confirmed in the example in the Vatican Museums, which was provided in antiquity with an inscription that reads ϹΑΡΔΑΝΑΠΑΛΛΟϹ (Sardanápallos), giving the type its erroneous name (it has no true association with this legendary king). It was also restored with a modern thyrsus in wood and iron. The Roman copy is based on a lost earlier Greek original of about 350-325 BCE and has been attributed to Praxiteles.

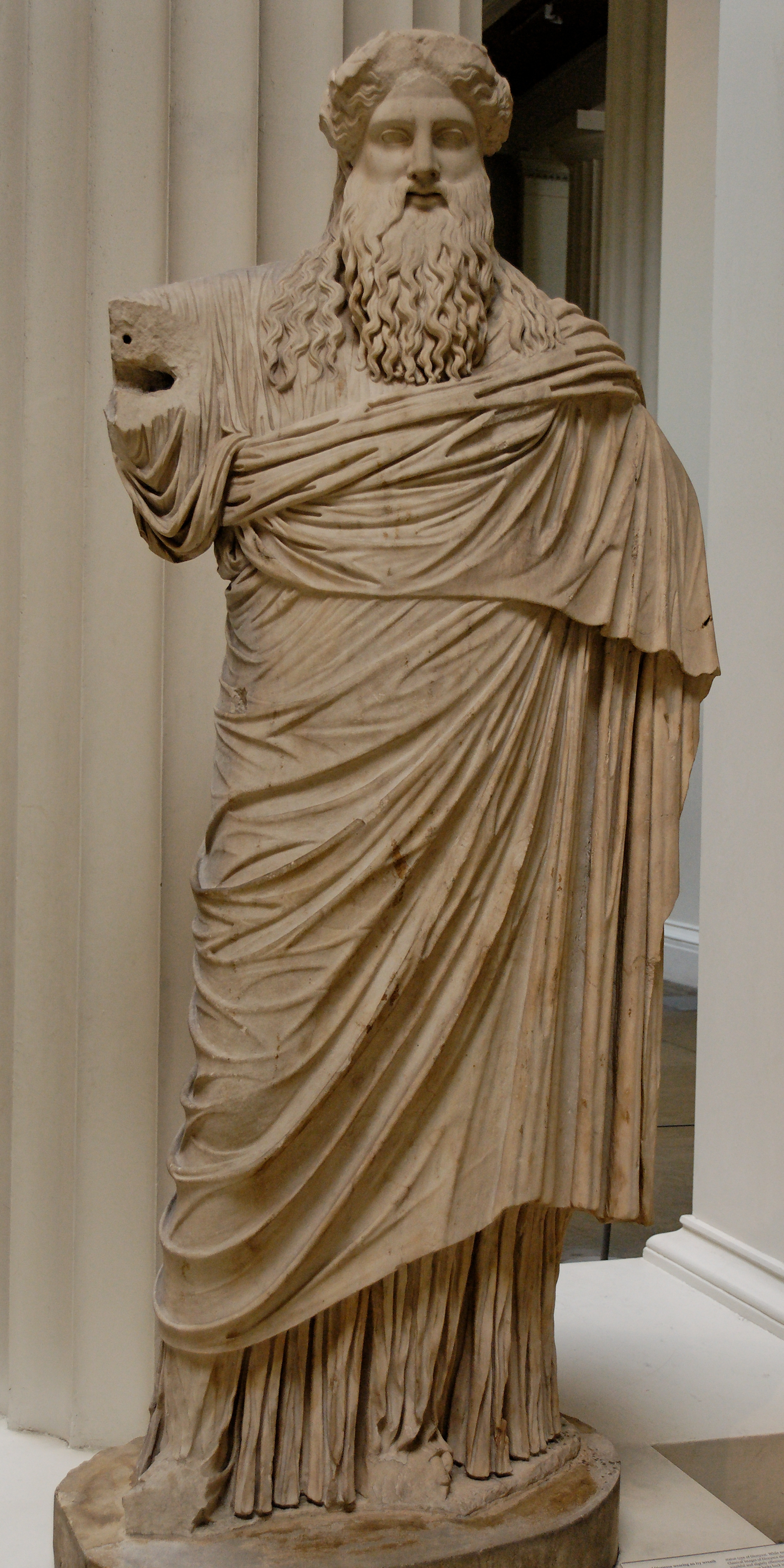
Dionysus Sardanapalus from the British Museum

In the early 19th century, Ennio Quirino Visconti cogently argued, against Johann Joachim Winckelmann and other earlier antiquarians, that the "Sardanapalus" of the Museo Pio-Clementino was in fact a Dionysus.

All the surviving Hellenistic-Roman variants are copied from a Greek original of about 325 BC. The type first occurred at a time when the god's iconography was otherwise changing to a largely youthful and effeminate physical type (as seen, for example, here). The Romans elaborated the Sardanapalus type further, often showing the god with subsidiary figures. Though the type appears restrained, multiple copies of a popular relief sculpture exist with a figure of the same type, but drunk and propped up by a satyr.

== Gallery ==
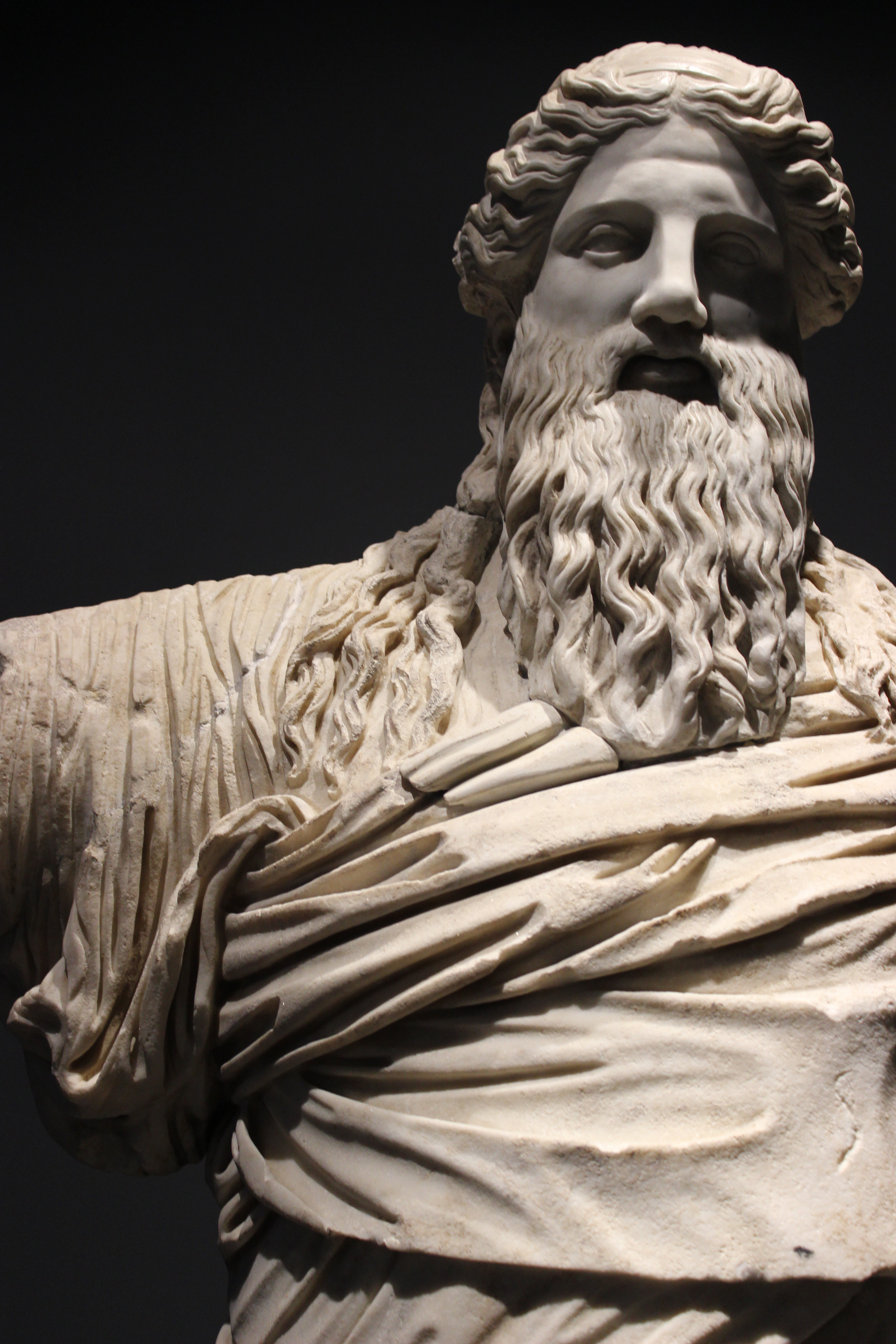
Statue of Dionysus Sardanapalus. The marble is a Roman copy c. AD 40 - 60 of a Greek original c. 350 - 325 BC.

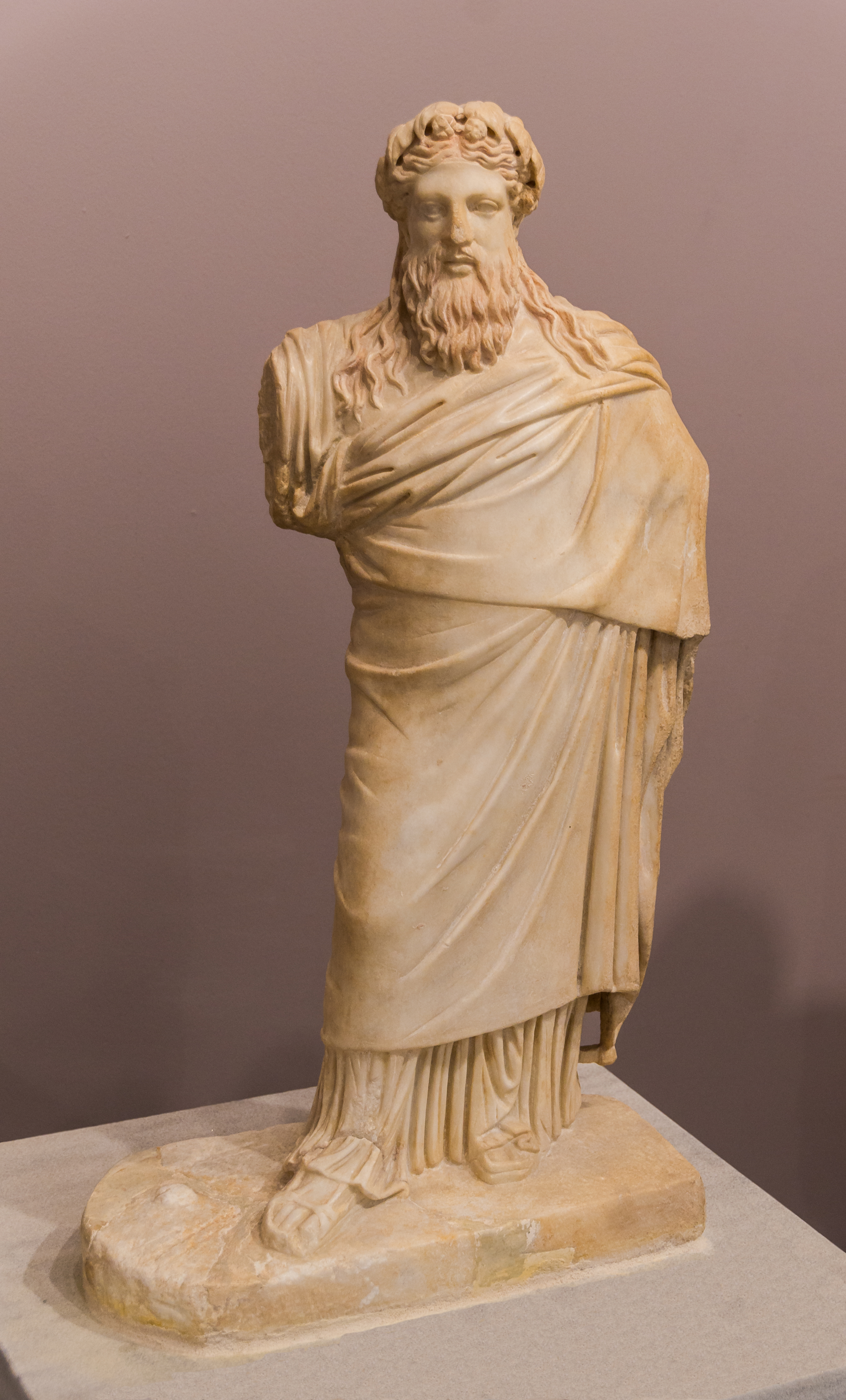
Small statue of Dionysus, with a wreath of Ivy and pine nuts. Traces of red color are preserved. It copies the so-called "Sardanapalus statuary type", by Praxiteles (-300). Found in Knossos

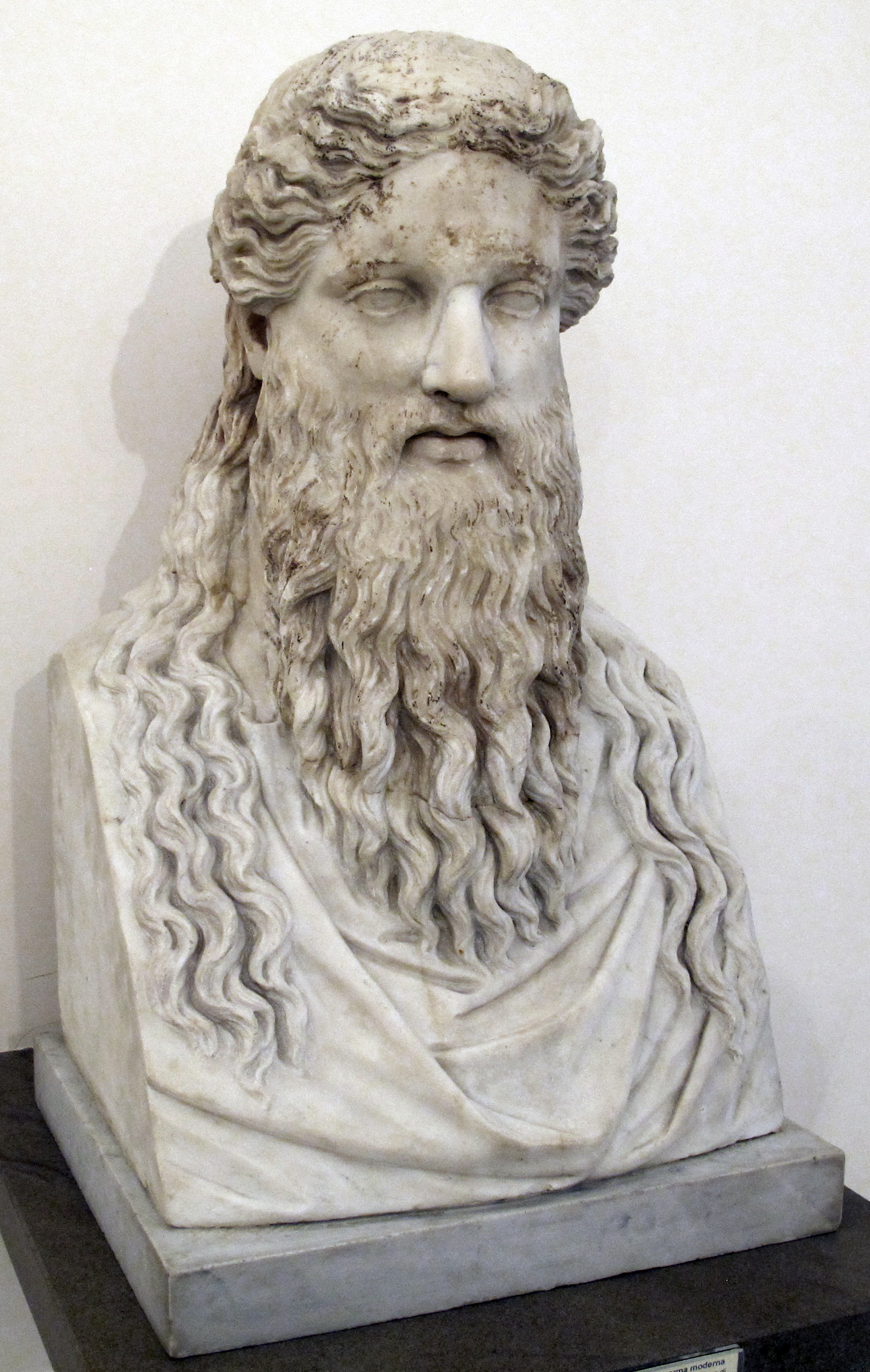
Dionysus of the Sardanapalus type on a herm, copy from around 150, from a Greek original from around 310 BC

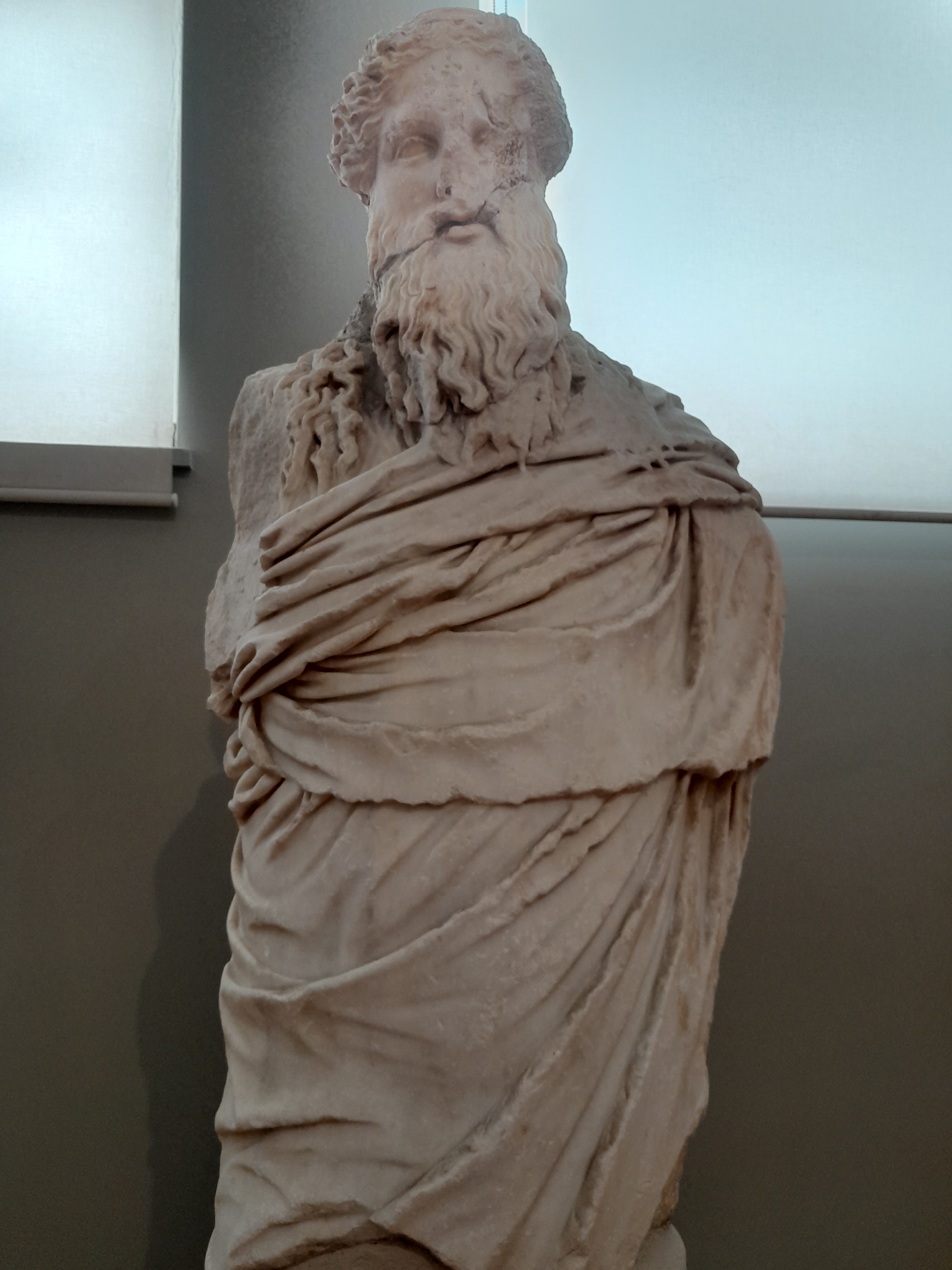
Statue of Dionysos of the Sardanapalus type, Pentelic marble. Found in the Theatre of Dionysos in Athens. Copy made in the 1st c. AD, after a Praxitelean original about 325-300 BC. National Archaeological Museum of Athens Greece

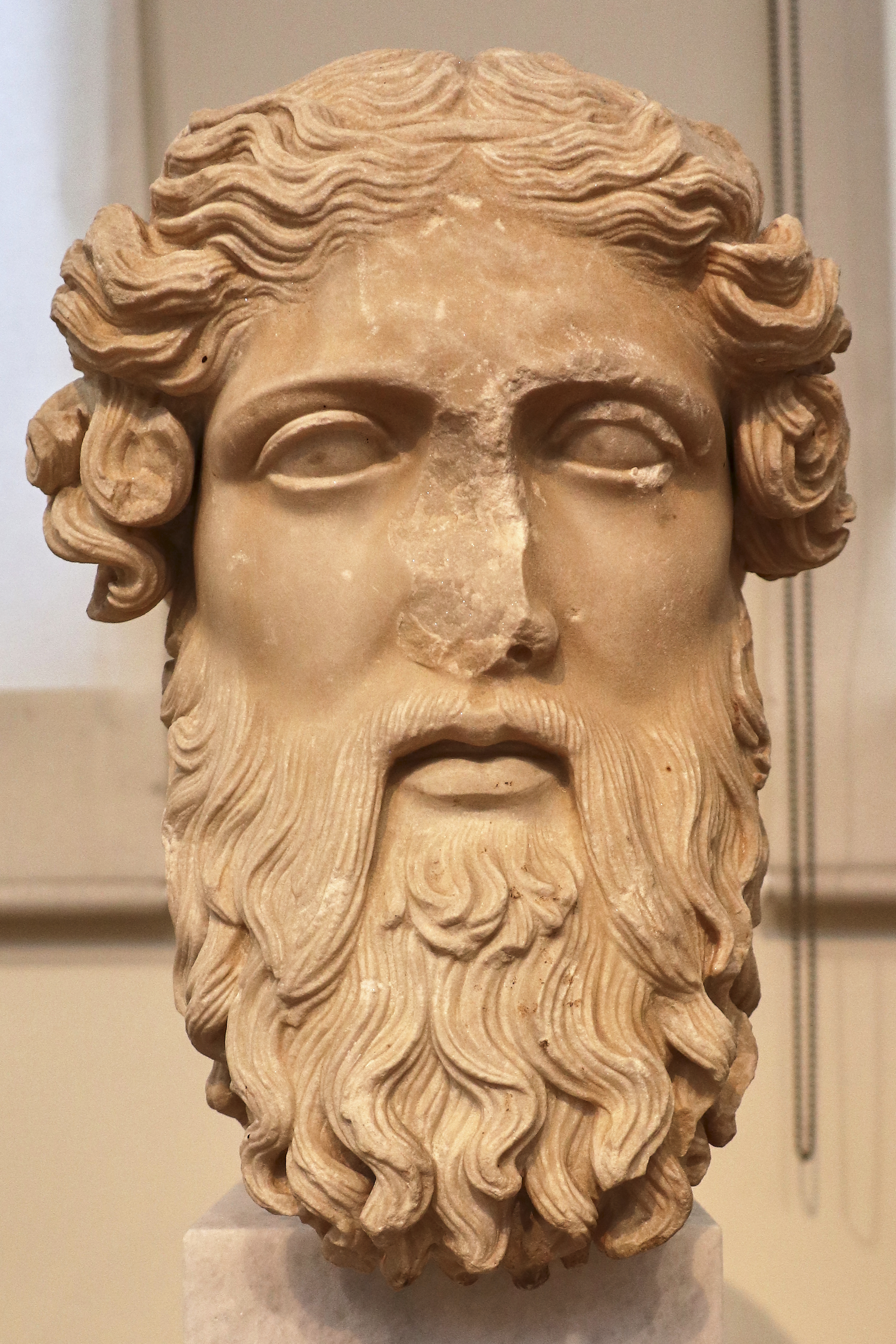
Marble head of Dionysus. Found in the theatre near the Zea harbor, Piraeus. It belongs to the Athens / Kos type, which is related to the Dionysus-Sardanapalus type. Classicising work of the 1st century A.D., inspired by 4th century B.C. original

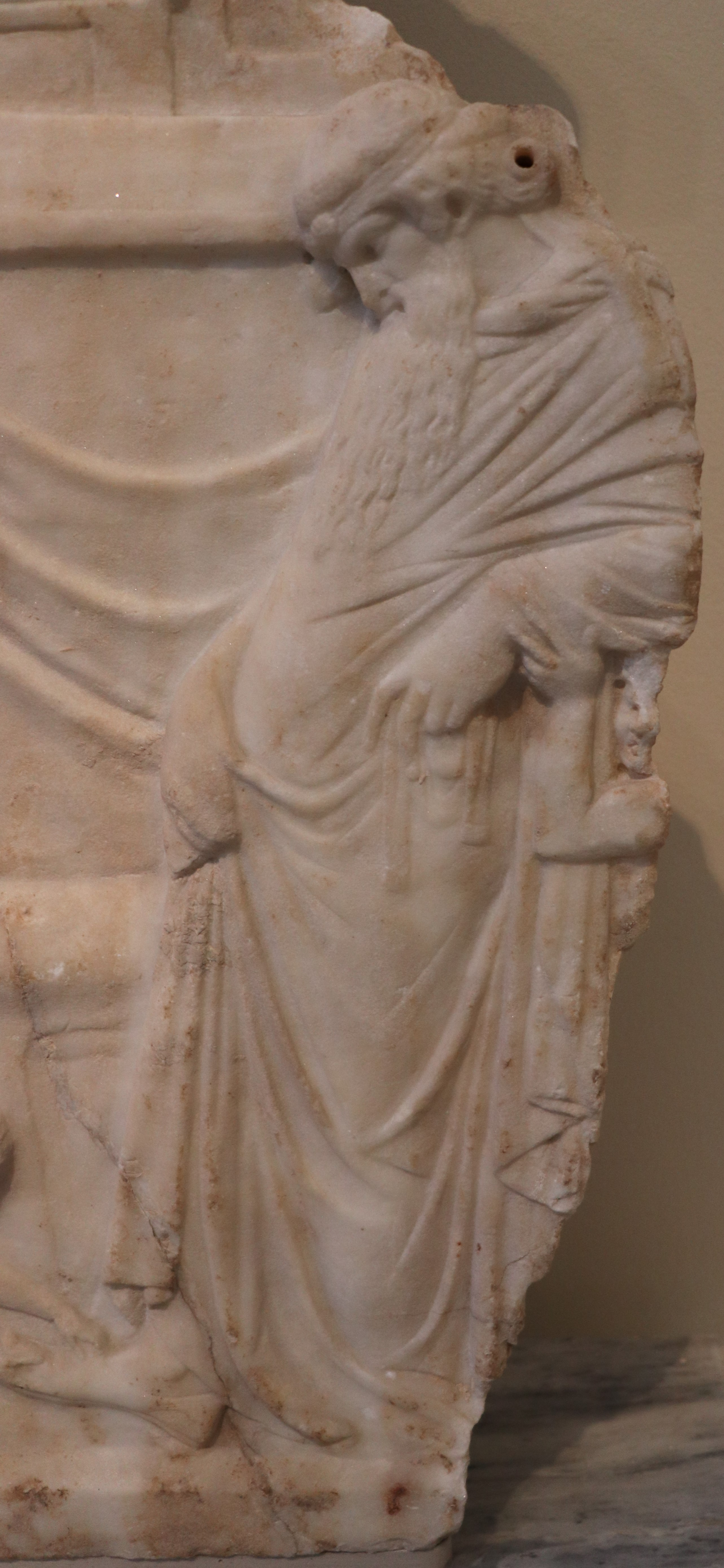
Marble Relief of Dionysus of the Sardanapalus type visiting Ikarios, Early 1st Cent. ACE

== Examples ==
- Fragments successively excavated at the Theatre of Dionysus, Athens.
- Herakleion Archaeological Museum, small marble copy, 2nd - 3rd c. AD from Knossos
- Naples'
- Palermo'
- Uffizi, Florence.
- Another example of the type is a Roman marble, about AD 40–60, in the British Museum; it was carved in a single large block of Pentelic marble, except for the missing right arm, which was made separately and attached. It is said to have been found at Posillipo, Campania, Italy. Height: 2.2 m. From the Castellani Collection. GR 1878.11-6.1 (Sculpture 1606)
- National Museum of Rome

In Oliver Stone's biopic Alexander (2004), Dionysus is shown on-screen as bearded, longhaired, crowned with ivy, and draped in a lion skin and voluminous chiton, in a variation on this "Sardanapalus" statue type.
