= Saint Adrian =

- Adrian of Nicomedia (died 306), Herculian Guard of the Roman Emperor Galerius
- Adrian of Canterbury (died 710), scholar and the Abbot of St Augustine's Abbey in Canterbury
- Adrian of Corinth (died 251), early Christian saint and martyr; see April 17 (Eastern Orthodox liturgics)
- Pope Adrian III (died 885)
- Adrian of May (died 875), Scottish saint and martyr from the Isle of May, martyred by Vikings
- Adrian of Poshekhon (died 1550), Russian Orthodox saint, hegumen of Dormition monastery in Yaroslavl region
- Adrian of Monza, Russian Orthodox saint, see May 5 (Eastern Orthodox liturgics)
- Adrian of Ondrusov (died 1547), Russian Orthodox saint and wonder-worker
- San Adrian (tunnel) and hermitage, a landmark in the Way of St. James

== See also ==
- Adrian (disambiguation)
- Sant'Adriano (disambiguation)
- Santo Adriano
