= Zoninus collar =

4th–5th century AD late Roman slave collar

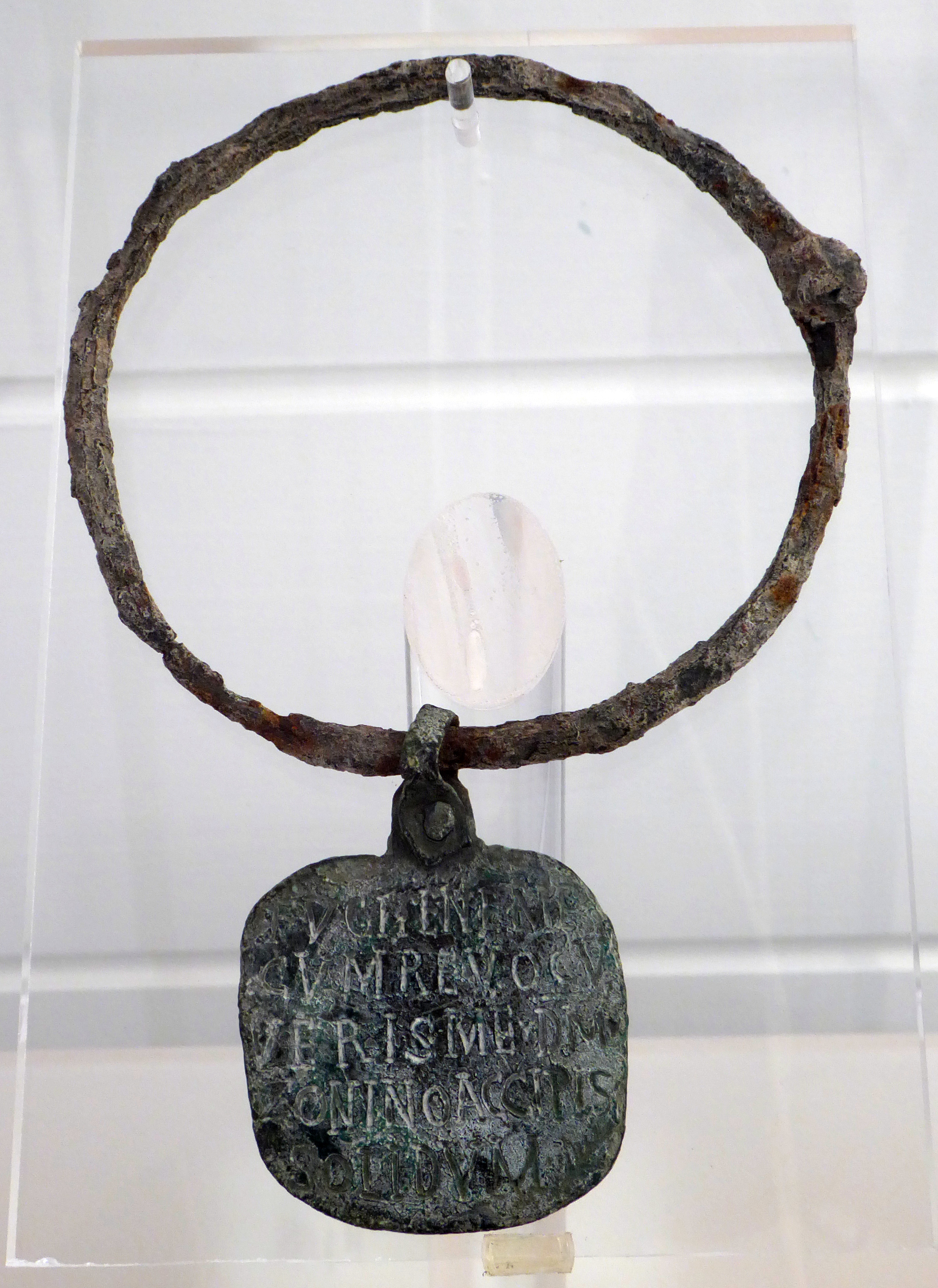
- Type: Slave collar
- Material: Iron and bronze
- Writing: Latin
- Symbols: palm branch
- Period/culture: 4th/5th century AD
- Present location: Museo Nazionale Romano, Rome, Italy
- Identification: inv. no. 65043
- Culture: Late Roman

The Zoninus collar is a late Roman slave collar dating to the 4th–5th century AD, consisting of an iron neck ring, permanently riveted shut, and a bronze tag inscribed in Latin. The inscription identified the wearer as a fugitive slave and promised a reward for returning him to his owner, Zoninus. The collar is one of roughly forty-five surviving Roman slave collars, all dating to late antiquity. Its findspot is unknown; it was first documented in 1749 and is now held by the Museo Nazionale Romano in Rome.

== Description ==
The Zoninus collar is perhaps the best known and most complete example among approximately 45 surviving slave collars, all dating from late antiquity, and mostly found in Italy (especially Rome and central Italy, including one in the British Museum) with a few from North Africa (e.g., Thelepte, Lambaesis and Bulla Regia). The collar consists of an iron neck ring with a bronze tag attached by a loop; uniquely among known examples, the tag remains attached to the original ring. It dates from the 4th or 5th century AD.

=== Ring ===
The iron ring is of circular cross-section, not hinged; it was riveted closed around the neck with a single hammered rivet, implying permanent fastening. It measures approximately 12 centimetres (4.7 in) in diameter (37.7 cm (14.8 in) in circumference), roughly a snug modern men's small-to-medium, and would fit an adult man as well as a woman or child. Collars of this sort sat close enough to the neck that they could not be slipped off, but not so close that they would impede breathing.

=== Tag ===
The bronze tag is rectangular, about 5 centimetres (2 in) × 5 cm (2 in) × 0.1 cm (0.04 in), engraved on one face. The letters are about 7 mm (0.3 in) high, executed in Roman capitals with interpuncts, and a palm-branch mark follows the text.

Tag inscription	Full version	Translation
FVGITENEME; CVMREVOCV; VERISME ·DM· ZONINOACCIPIS; SOLIDVM ⸙	fūgī; tenē mē. cum revoc(ā)veris mē d(ominō) m(eō); Zoninō, accipis solidum ⸙	I have run away; hold me. When you have brought me back to my master Zoninus, you will receive a gold coin ⸙

The use of the first person ("I have run away") appropriates the slave's own voice to speak the master's will. The promised reward reflects an urban system of slave control in which passersby might intercept fugitives. The solidus, about 4.5 g (0.14 ozt) of pure gold, became an important denomination in Roman coinage beginning under Constantine (r. 306 – 337 AD). The palm-branch symbol may be a Christian reference; comparable collars also bear Christian motifs, such as the Chi-Rho.

=== Interpretation ===
Most scholars interpret collars such as the Zoninus collar as punitive restraints imposed after escape attempts and as an alternative to the earlier Roman practice of tattooing or branding runaway slaves' faces. Greco-Roman literature attests to brief phrases tattooed or branded on the forehead of runaways (e.g., "I have escaped; hold/catch me"), serving as visible signals to bystanders. While most Roman slave collars share similar structure and content, the Zoninus collar is the only known example that promises a reward for returning the wearer to the master.

Late-19th-century writers, uneasy about slave-owning among early Christians, floated the theory that these inscribed collars were for dogs. In 1899, archaeologist Heinrich Dressel argued that the Zoninus collar's dimensions were too small for a human neck and more consistent with a dog collar; he also judged the stated reward to be unrealistically low for a slave. In reality, inscriptions explicitly identify human ownership (e.g., "I am the slave of ..."), and some collars have been found still on the necks of human skeletons. Additionally, historian Marianna Bodnaruk (writing in 2022), notes that a solidus is "a reward too high for the return of a dog by any calculation". Generally, evidence undercuts any notion that early Christians were notably less accepting of slavery than their contemporaries.

== History of documentation ==
The Zoninus collar first entered the historical record in 1749, in the Museum Veronense by Marchese Francesco Scipione Maffei, a catalogue of antiquities in Verona. Its original findspot is unknown, but its good preservation suggests a protected context, such as a tomb. In that catalogue it appears not in Maffei's own museum but as part of the collection of Marchese Alessandro Capponi (1683–1746) of Rome. The object passed through several hands; after Capponi's death, the collar entered the Museo Kircheriano in Rome, originally assembled by the 17th-century Jesuit polymath Athanasius Kircher, before its acquisition by the Italian state. It is now held by the Museo Nazionale Romano (Museo Epigrafico, Baths of Diocletian).

A full-color photo of the Zoninus collar fills the cover of the first, landmark volume of the Cambridge World History of Slavery.

== See also ==
- Christian views on slavery
- Slavery in ancient Rome

== Bibliography ==
- Bodnaruk, Mariana (2022). "Late Antique Slavery in Epigraphic Evidence". In de Wet, Chris L.; Kahlos, Maijastina; Vuolanto, Ville (eds.). Slavery in the Late Antique World, 150 – 700 CE. Cambridge: Cambridge University Press. pp. 224–248. ISBN 978-1-108-69998-3.
- Kamen, Deborah (2010). "A Corpus of Inscriptions: Representing Slave Marks in Antiquity". Memoirs of the American Academy in Rome. 55: 95–110. ISSN 0065-6801. JSTOR 41419689.
- Trimble, Jennifer (2016). "The Zoninus Collar and the Archaeology of Roman Slavery". American Journal of Archaeology. 120 (3): 447–472. doi:10.3764/aja.120.3.0447. ISSN 0002-9114. JSTOR 10.3764/aja.120.3.0447.
