= Sant'Adriano =

Sant'Adriano may refer to:

- Sant'Adriano al Foro, former church building in Rome, Italy
- Sant'Adriano III Papa, Spilamberto, Roman Catholic parish church located in Spilamberto, province of Modena, region of Emilia-Romagna, Italy.

== See also ==
- Adriano (disambiguation)
- Saint Adrian (disambiguation)
- Santo Adriano
