= Ponte Garibaldi =

Bridge in Rome, Italy

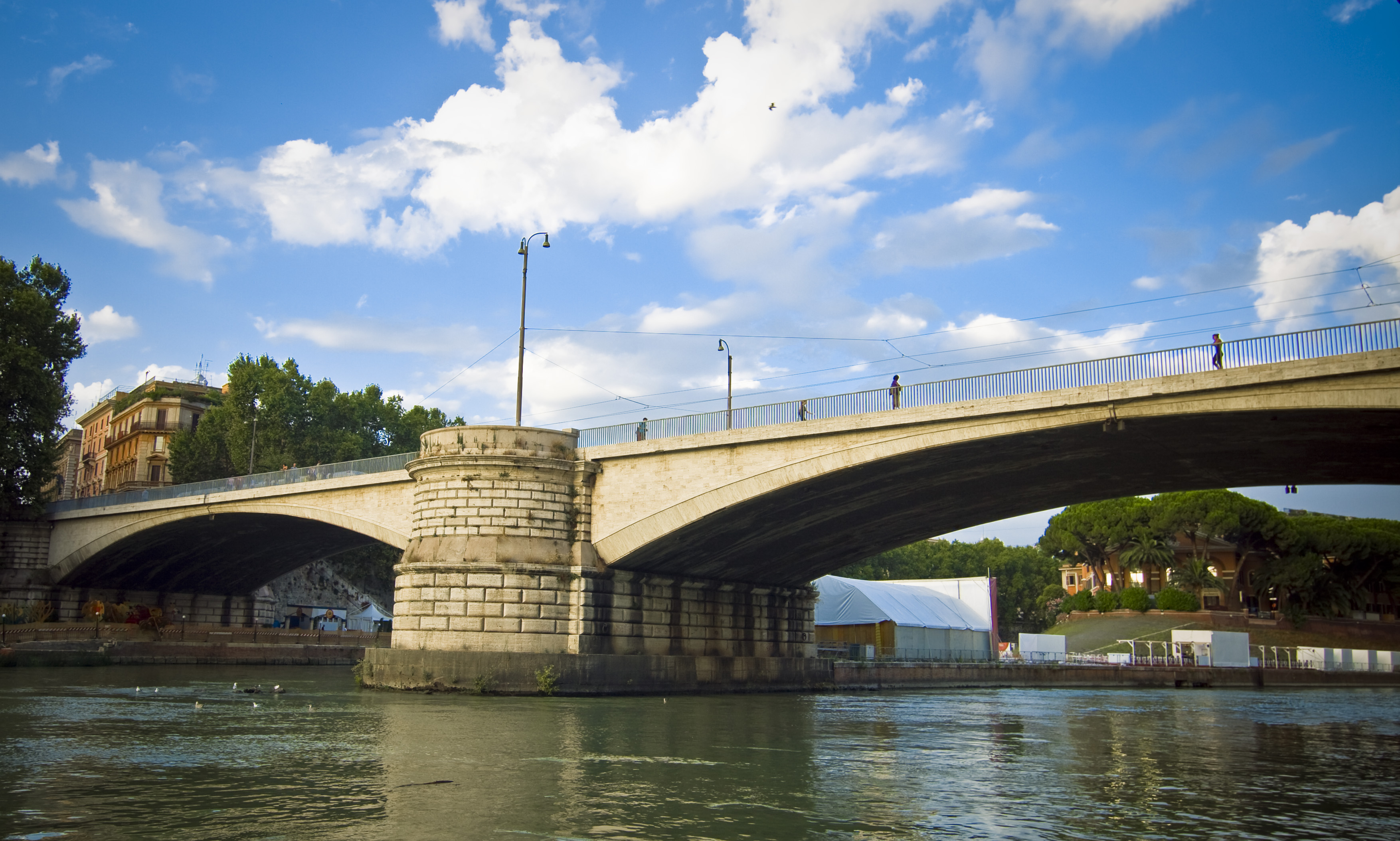
- Coordinates: 41°53′28.06″N 12°28′28.52″E
- Crosses: Tiber
- Locale: Rome

Characteristics
- Total length: 120 metres (390 ft)

History
- Architect: Angelo Vescovali
- Construction start: 1884
- Inaugurated: 1888

Location
- Click on the map for a fullscreen view

Ponte Garibaldi is a bridge that links Lungotevere De' Cenci to Piazza Giuseppe Gioachino Belli in Rome (Italy), in the Rioni Regola and Trastevere.

== Description ==
The bridge was designed by architect Angelo Vescovali and built between 1884 and 1888; it was dedicated to Giuseppe Garibaldi, "Hero of Two Worlds" and one of the fathers of Italian unification. The bridge, enlarged in 1959, was released to facilitate the expansion of the town towards Trastevere.

It has two metal spans, which lie on a central shaft and on two smaller shafts covered with travertine; it is 120 metres (390 ft) long.

== Transportation ==
Ponte Garibaldi is crossed by buses and the tram Line 8, which connects the Roma Trastevere railway station with Piazza Venezia.

== Bibliography ==
- Ravaglioli, Armando (1997). Roma anno 2750 ab Urbe condita. Storia, monumenti, personaggi, prospettive. Rome: Tascabili Economici Newton. ISBN 88-8183-670-X.
- Rendina, Claudio (2005). Enciclopedia di Roma. Rome: Newton Compton Editori. ISBN 88-541-0304-7.
