= Arbaces (disambiguation) =

Arbaces was the founder of the Median Empire according to Ctesias.

Arbaces may also refer to:

- Harpagus, Median general of the 6th century BC
- Arbaces (satrap)
- Arbaces, the protagonist of the Jacobean play A King and No King
- Arbacès, character of the Alix comics
