= The Fall of Nineveh =

Poem by Edwin Atherstone

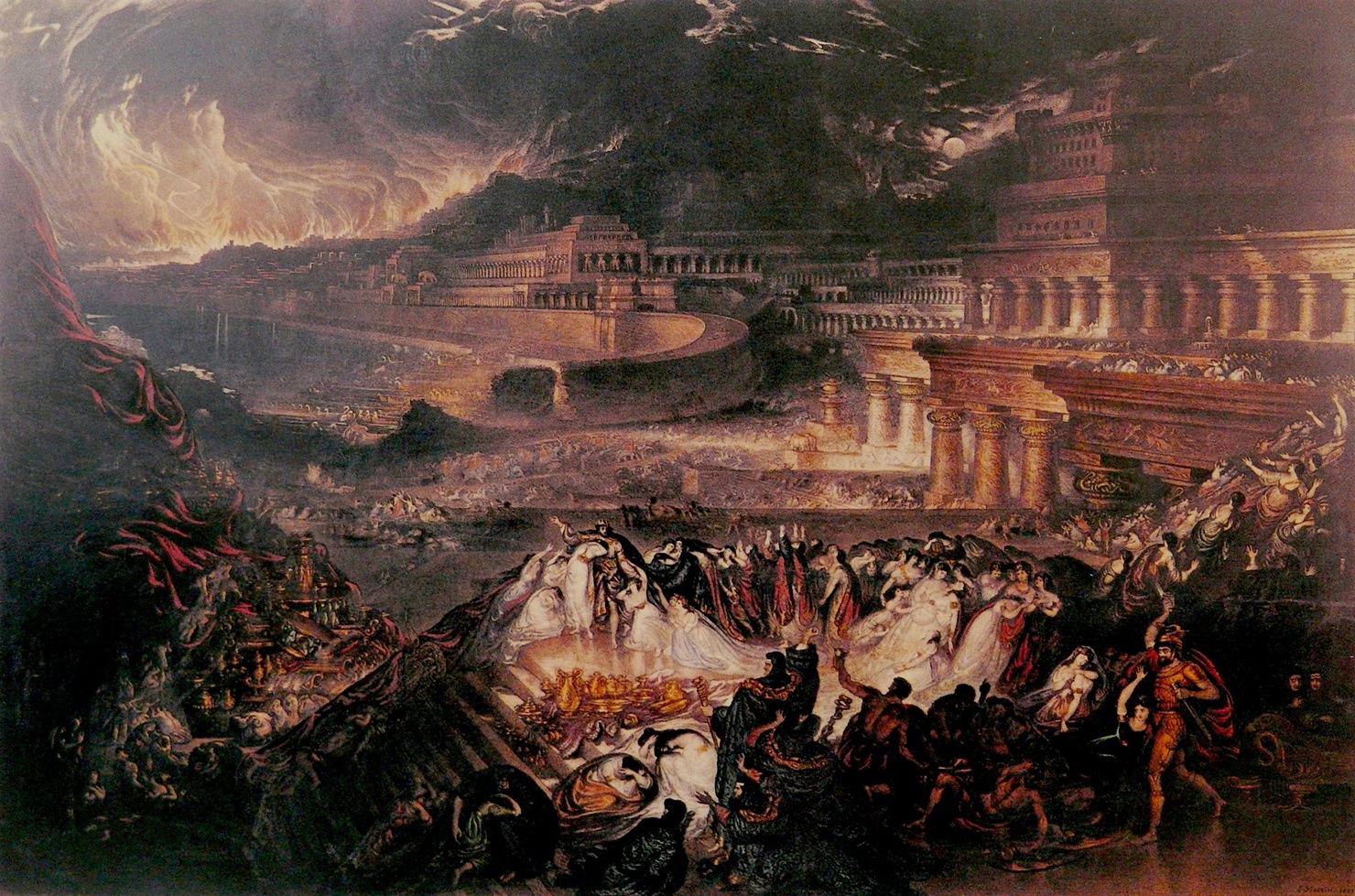
The Fall of Nineveh, painting by John Martin (1829), inspired by Edwin Atherstone's poem

The Fall of Nineveh is a long poem in blank verse by Edwin Atherstone. It consists of thirty books preceded by a Prelude. The poem was written over many years and published 1828–1868. It tells of the battles and events during the war between the coalition of Medes and Babylonians against the Assyrians.

== Plot ==
The main heroes are Sardanapalus, King of Nineveh and of all the Assyrian Empire; Arbaces, the prince of Medes; and a Babylonian priest, Belesis. Sardanapalus is portrayed as a womanizer, coward, and cruel tyrant. When defeated by Arbaces he burns his own palace with all his concubines inside and dies in the fire. All Nineveh is destroyed.

== Excerpt ==
The poem can be interpreted as praise of modern democracy. It begins:

Of Nineveh the mighty city of old,
The queen of all the nations,—at her throne
Kings worshipp'd, and from her their subject crowns,
Humbly obedient, held, and on her state
Submiss attended, nor such servitude
Opprobrious named—from that high eminence
How, like a star, she fell, and passed away,—
Such the high matter of my song shall be.
