= Caroline Grassari =

French opera singer

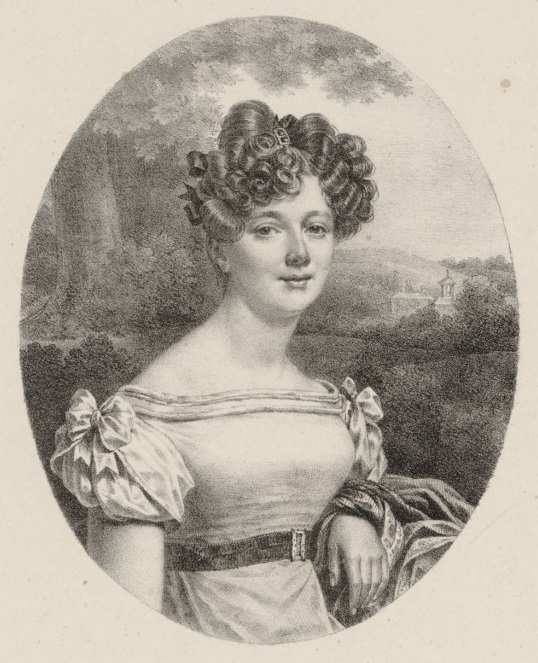
- Born: Marie-Caroline-Josephine Gérard; Tongeren, Belgium
- Baptised: 15 June 1795
- Died: after 1832
- Occupation: Opera singer (soprano)

Caroline Grassari, born Marie-Caroline-Josephine Gérard (baptised 15 June 1795 – after 1832) was a French opera singer active at the Paris Opéra from 1816 to 1828 where she sang leading soprano roles. Amongst the many roles she created were Almazie in Isouard's Aladin ou La lampe merveilleuse and Aurora in Carafa's La belle au bois dormant.

== Life and career ==
Grassari was born Marie-Caroline-Josephine Gérard in Tongeren, Belgium, where she was baptised on 15 June 1795. Her father was François Joseph Gérard, a highly decorated French general. Her mother, Anne-Christine Tournay, was the daughter of Tongeren's Burgomaster. Her parents divorced in her childhood and she initially lived with her mother in Belgium, where she began her musical studies. In 1814, she was sent to Paris under the care of her father and finished her studies at the Conservatoire de Paris.

She made her stage debut under the name "Mademoiselle Grassari" at the Paris Opéra on 13 February 1816 singing Antigone in Sacchini's Œdipe à Colone. She was then given a permanent position at the Opéra as premier remplacement, singing the roles of the primadonnas when they were unavailable as well as secondary roles. However, she soon rose to the first rank of singers and went on to create numerous leading roles for the company, including Aurora in Carafa's La belle au bois dormant and Elzire in Liszt's Don Sanche. In April 1819 she also sang in the Opéra's first and only performance of Maximilian Stadler's oratorio La Délivrance de Jérusalem. (Note: The other soloists in the performance of La Délivrance de Jérusalem were the tenor Jean-Baptiste Lecomte and the bass Nicolas Levasseur.) Grassari was described in contemporary accounts as uniting a beautiful voice with compelling acting and a charming stage presence. She was particularly admired for her performances as Amazily in Spontini's Fernand Cortez and the title role in Méhul's Stratonice.

One of Grassari's last performances at the Opéra was in May 1827 as Pamina in Les mystères d'Isis, a pastiche opera by Ludwig Wenzel Lachnith based on the story of Mozart's Die Zauberflöte. Faced with enormous deficits in 1828, Émile Lubbert, the new director of the Opéra, gave notice to Henri-Étienne Dérivis that his contract would not be renewed and asked Grassari to retire early. She was paid 30,000 francs to cancel her contract. According to her father's death certificate, she was still alive when he died in September 1832. Earlier that year articles had appeared in Gazette des Tribunaux and Giornale del Regno delle Due Sicilie describing a lawsuit which she brought against her former protector and lover, Jean-François Levrat, (Note: Prior to his relationship with Grassari, Levrat had been the protector of Joséphine Rolandeau (1774–1809), a singer at the Opéra-Comique. For more on the role of "protector" in the theatrical life in 19th-century France, see White, Kimberly (2018). Female Singers on the French Stage, 1830–1848, pp. 175–178. Cambridge University Press. ISBN 1108643191 and Dickinson, Linzy (2000). Theatre in Balzac's La Comédie Humaine, pp. 130–168. Rodopi. ISBN 9042005491.) whom she accused of using her pension from the Opéra to pay off his creditors. (Note: In his testimony Levrat claimed that he had met Grassari when she was still a student at the Paris conservatory and living in a garret in extreme poverty. In Levrat's telling, he set her up in a luxurious house replete with Aubusson carpets and crystal chandeliers, satisfied all of her "whims" which were both "expensive and continuous", invited her mother and siblings to move in with her, and also paid all their expenses. According to Levrat, once he found himself in financial difficulty twelve years later, Grassari was no longer happy to "lavish him with her caresses" as she had in the past and became simply a "greedy woman". The Commerce Tribunal ultimately dismissed the case on the grounds that it was an interpersonal dispute rather than commercial one and not within the court's purview. Grassari was ordered to pay Levrat's legal costs.) Apart from those articles, news of her disappeared completely from the French press after her retirement. Arthur Pougin wrote in 1906 that despite an extensive search, he was unable to find any publication of the date of her death, a fact which he found remarkable given her considerable fame during the twelve years she was on the stage.

== Roles created ==
Grassari's performances in world premieres at the Paris Opéra included:

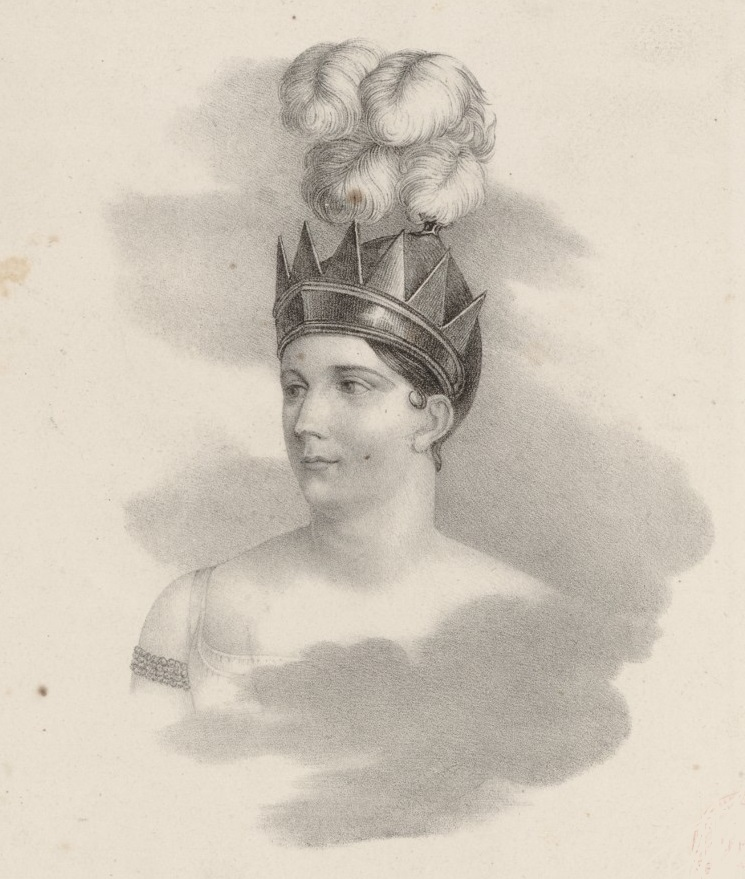
Grassari as Almasie in Aladin ou La lampe merveilleuse

- Parthénope in Les dieux rivaux ou Les fêtes de Cythère (opera-ballet in 1 act) jointly composed by Berton, Kreutzer, Loiseau de Persuis and Spontini; 21 June 1816 (marking the marriage of the Duke of Berry)
- Alexis in Nathalie ou La famille russe (opera in 3 acts) composed by Reicha; 30 July 1816
- Aspasie in Aspasie et Périclès (opera in 1 act) composed by Daussoigne-Méhul; 17 July 1820
- Almasie in Aladin ou La lampe merveilleuse (opera in 5 acts) composed by Isouard; 6 February 1822
- Virginie in Virginie ou Les Décemvirs (opera in 3 acts) composed by Berton; 11 June 1823
- Lasthénie in Lasthénie (opera in 1 act) composed by Hérold; 8 September 1823
- La Reine in Vendôme en Espagne (opera in 1 act) jointly composed by Auber and Hérold; 5 December 1823 (marking the return of the Duke of Angoulême from Spain)
- Zénaire in Ipsiboé (opera in 4 acts) composed by Kreutzer; 31 March 1824
- Zuléma in Les deux Salem (opera in 1 act) composed by Daussoigne-Méhul; 12 July 1824
- Aurora in La belle au bois dormant (opera in 3 acts) composed by Carafa; 2 March 1825
- Phédora in Pharamond (opera in 3 acts) jointly composed by Boieldieu, Berton, and Kreutzer; 10 June 1825 (marking the coronation of Charles X)
- Elzire in Don Sanche, ou Le château de l'amour (opera in 1 act) composed by Liszt; 17 October 1825
