= Don Sanche =

Opera by Franz Liszt

- Opera by Franz Liszt
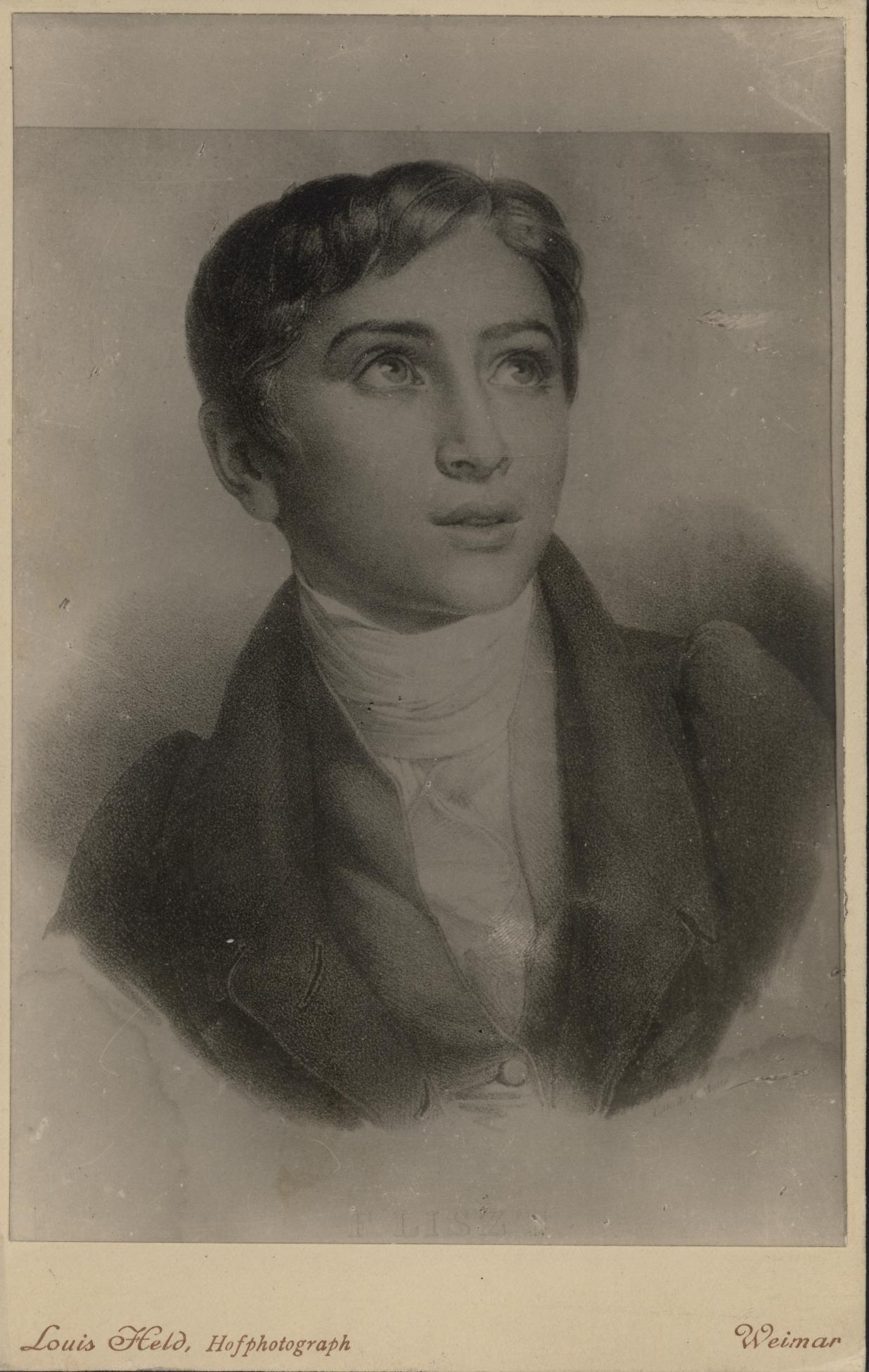
- The composer, c. 1827
- Librettist: Emmanuel Théaulon; de Rancé
- Language: French
- Based on: story by Jean-Pierre Claris de Florian
- Premiere: 17 October 1825; Salle Le Peletier, Paris

Don Sanche, ou Le château de l'amour (English: Don Sanche, or The Castle of Love), S.1, is an opera in one act composed in 1824–25 by Franz Liszt in his early teen years, with French libretto by Théaulon and de Rancé, based on a story by Jean-Pierre Claris de Florian. For 30 years it was believed to be lost until it was rediscovered in 1903. The first modern performance took place in 1977, 74 years after its rediscovery.

== History ==
=== Composition ===
The opera appears to have been ready as early as September 1824. It is known that on 20 June 1825, Liszt presented an overture in his second Birmingham concert. This is probably the one from Don Sanche since no other overture exists from this period. The manuscript contains many passages that are reminiscent of the style of his compositions teacher Ferdinando Paer, who admittedly helped Liszt with orchestration. Liszt received a mere 170 francs for his opera (approximately 2100 dollars in 2016 USD). Later in the 1840s, Liszt tried to pursue a career as an opera composer. He planned, sketched, but never completed several other operas. Among them a work in the Italianate style known as Sardanapale, of which 111 sketched pages exists.

=== Premiere ===
Don Sanche premiered at the Salle Le Peletier of the Paris Opéra on 17 October 1825 with Rodolphe Kreutzer conducting. Liszt was a few days short of 14 years at the time of the premiere. Lina Ramann, his biographer, wrote:

The 17th October (1825) had come, the day when "Don Sancho" [sic] was to be presented to the public. A brilliant audience had assembled in the Opera House. Rudolf Kreutzer was the director, the noble and celebrated tenor, Adolf Nourrit sang the principal part; all the cooperators did their best to secure success, and the public followed the first piece of the youthful composer with growing interest. At the conclusion the applause was boundless; the public called rapturously for their darling and for Nourrit, the singer of the principal part. Then the latter, a tall and stately figure, with an overflowing of amiability, took in his arms the young composer, still small for his fourteen years, and carried him before the audience, whose jubilation was without bounds. Kreutzer, too, came and caressed and embraced him. Adam Liszt was beside himself with joy. The tears streamed from his eyes a reception such as "Don Sancho" [sic] had found exceeded all expectation! Franz, on the contrary, was only glad on his father's account; his manner was serious, almost forbidding; that Nourrit, in spite of his struggling, should have carried him before the public, like a child, gnawed to his inmost heart. He received the applause, too, as only intended for his youth, and could scarcely be tranquillized either as to himself or the worth of his work.

=== Reception ===
Reviews were mixed. In 1826, Almanach des Spectacles declared that "this work has to be judged with indulgence." In reply to his biographer, when asked about the overture of Don Sanche in 1880, Liszt said that if the lost opera would ever come to light it ought not be published "since it was nothing, it became nothing." The opera was not well received, and only 4 performances took place. The opera was not staged again for more than 150 years.

=== Rediscovery ===
It was believed that the manuscript perished in the 1873 fire of Salle Peletier. However, in 1903 the scholar Jean Chantavoine found the manuscript score of the opera bound in two volumes in the library of Palais Garnier. The score is not copied in Liszt's hand, contains extensive rehearsal markings and passages reminiscent of Paer, all of which led Emil Haraszti, a music critic, to declare that the opera was not by Liszt at all but a production by Paer only. He could not bring himself to believe that a 13-year-old boy could produce such a relatively polished work. However, Adam Liszt disclosed so many details to Carl Czerny about his son's opera-in-progress that such claims are preposterous.

Since its discovery there have been few productions of the opera. The first modern performance took place on 20 October 1977, at the Collegiate Theatre in London. To date, the score of the opera has not been published, and only a handful of microfilms of the manuscript are in circulation in various libraries of Europe and the United States. The original score is located in the Bibliothèque-Musée de l'Opéra in Paris.

== Roles ==
Role	Voice type	Premiere Cast, 17 October 1825 (Conductor: Rodolphe Kreutzer)
Don Sanche	tenor	Adolphe Nourrit
Princess Elzire	soprano or mezzo-soprano	Caroline Grassari
Alidor	baritone	
A page	soprano	
Zélise	soprano or mezzo-soprano	
A lady	soprano	
A knight	tenor	

== Synopsis ==
=== Part I ===
Nighttime, full moon outlines the silhouette of a Gothic castle, the Castle of Love.

A pastoral song of invitation is heard from the cheerful company within the castle. Here estate and rank count for nothing and the song of peasants and nobles is entwined in the chorus of loving couples. The knight Don Sanche, arrives but a page bars his way at the gate, as only couples may enter this castle where love is a precondition. Don Sanche relates what lies heavily on his heart: he cannot join the happy inmates of the castle because the one he loves, the beauteous Princess Elzire is cruel and does not return his affections. The light march of the page and the chorus does not promise much hope for the desperate knight and Don Sanche almost plays with the thought of suicide.

Alidor, Lord of the castle, appears. He tells how he had his castle built as a memorial to love, in gratitude to destiny for having assigned him many happy lovers' trysts. Alidor, who is also a magician, sees Elzire's future: the girl will choose a royal scion as her husband. Jealousy and a desire to fight are awakened in Don Sanche and he sings an angry duet with Alidor. Meanwhile he learns from Alidor that the Princess is on her way towards Navarre. The magician promises to divert Elzire from her intended route. Alidor is left alone and, as the sky becomes overclouded, he gives an order to the spirits to summon a storm before Elzire approaches with her retinue.

The village people are afraid of the devastating storm. As the thunder subsides, Elzire and Zelis, her lady-in-waiting, seek refuge in the Castle of Love but they too are stopped by the page. He tells the newcomers the rules of the game in a song. Elzire and Zelis express their horror at the strict order. There is nothing to be done: Elzire and her retinue cannot enter even though it is night and the storm is raging. The page has a saving idea: he mentions Don Sanche as a possible means of entering the castle, since the young man is madly in love with the Princess. But Elzire will not hear of it.

The storm begins raging again, the page withdraws into the castle, and the drawbridge is lifted. Elzire's men seek refuge in the forest. Zelis reproaches her lady for her coldness and pride and explains what has happened with the revenge of love. A knight named Romualde is pestering Princess Elzire with his love and it also turns out that in Navarre Elzire hopes to meet her intended husband. We learn from Elzire that this unknown hero and would-be husband is the cause of her refusing Don Sanche, though the hero's figure has so far appeared only in the Princess's dreams. Zelis considers it would be better to accept the amorous services of Don Sanche, who is here at hand, particularly as the night is very cold. Don Sanche appears but Elzire remains firm as a rock. Alidor appears on the terrace of the castle and conjures up a bank of turf with his wand. The tired Princess lies down beneath the leafy bower and falls asleep. In the same dreamy, lulling mood Don Sanche sings a lullaby to his loved one. The young man also dreams of his lady requiting his love.

=== Part II ===
The group returns to the secret halls of the castle. The chorus announces the approach of the evil knight Romualde, who wastes no time in asking for the hand of the Princess, even threatening her with force. Don Sanche cannot tolerate this and the two knights unsheathe their swords. As Don Sanche fights for the lady he loves so hopelessly, Elzire is overcome by remorse and sympathy for the brave knight slowly awakens her love. Her prayer to Cupid is one of repentance and a confession of love.

Don Sanche is mortally wounded in combat and his last wish is to bid farewell to life at the side of his beloved lady. The wounded hero is carried to Elzire to the sounds of a funeral march. In a sudden decision, The Princess tells Zelis to request entry into the Castle of Love as she is willing to give her own life to Don Sanche in exchange for his. The page yields to Elzire's request. It turns out that the part of the evil Romualde has been played by Alidor the magician and that the combat and the mortal wound were all a test of love. Elzire and Don Sanche swear undying love to each other and the people together with the happy amorous couples, jubilantly glorify the triumph of love.

== Noted arias ==
- "Aimer, aimer voilà" – Don Sanche in Part I, Scene III

== Recordings ==
- Tamás Pál conducting the Hungarian State Opera Orchestra and Chorus, with Gérard Garino, Julia Hamari, István Gáti, Katalin Farkas, Iidiko Komlósi, Mária Zádori and Gábor Kállay (Hungaroton, 1986).
