= War Gods of Babylon =

- Directed by: Silvio Amadio
- Written by: Gino De Santis; Diego Fabbri
- Starring: Howard Duff; Jocelyn Lane; Luciano Marin
- Cinematography: Tino Santoni
- Edited by: Maurizio Lucidi
- Music by: Carlo Savina; Angelo Francesco Lavagnino
- Release date: 1962
- Running time: 88 minutes
- Country: Italy
- Languages: Italian; English

Le sette folgori di Assur (English title: War Gods of Babylon) is a 1962 Italian peplum colour film set in ancient Mesopotamia. The film anachronistically portrays as contemporaries several figures who historically lived hundreds of years apart.

== Plot ==
Mirra, a young girl whose parents were killed by the Assyrians, was found by Zoroaster, messenger of the gods, near her slaughtered people. He leads her to Nineveh ruled by King Sardanapalus. A love is born between her and Shammash, brother of the king. Sardanapalus loves her too and realizing that this passion could create discord with his brother appoints Shammash king of Babylon and sends him there with Mirra. The situation, however, exacerbates and magnifies their division until Assyria and Babylon are at war with each other. Eventually Sardanapulus offends the gods, resulting in a divine flood that destroys Assyria.

== Cast ==
- Howard Duff as Sardanapalus
- Jocelyn Lane as Mirra
- Luciano Marin as Sammash
- Giancarlo Sbragia as Arbace
- Arnoldo Foà as Zoroaster
- Stelio Candelli as Hammurabi
- José Greci as Crisia

== See also ==
- List of historical drama films and series set in Near Eastern and Western civilization
- I Am Semiramis (1963)
