= Edwin Atherstone =

English poet & novelist (1788-1872)

- Born: 1788
- Died: 1872 (aged 83–84)
- Occupations: poet, novelist
- Notable work: The Fall of Nineveh

Edwin Atherstone (1788–1872) was a poet and novelist. His works, which were planned on an imposing scale, attracted some temporary attention and applause, but are now forgotten. His chief poem, The Fall of Nineveh, consisting of thirty books, appeared at intervals from 1828 to 1868. It narrates about war waged by the coalition of many nations led by Median prince Arbaces and Babylonian priest Belesis against the tyrannical king of Assyria Sardanapalus, who, after being defeated in many battles, burns his own palace and dies within. He wrote also The Last Days of Herculaneum; and, Abradates and Panthea: Poems (1821), A Midsummer Day's Dream: a Poem (1824) and Israel in Egypt: a Poem (1861). He was a close friend and associate of the painter John Martin, whose well-known painting "The Fall of Nineveh" was produced in conjunction with Atherstone's poem.

He also produced two novels, The Sea Kings in England and The Handwriting on the Wall. The first one tells about the Viking invasion of England at the time of king Alfred the Great. Atherstone's plays were published posthumously by his daughter, Mary Elizabeth Atherstone in 1888.

== Works ==
- 1824 - A midsummer day's dream, a poem
- 1828 - The fall of Nineveh, a poem. The first six books, 1828
- 1858 - The handwriting on the wall, a story
- 1868 - The fall of Nineveh, a poem. Volume 2. Second edition: diligently corrected and otherwise improved
- 1888 - Dramatic works. Edited by his daughter, Mary Elizabeth Atherstone
