= La Belle au bois dormant (disambiguation) =

La Belle au bois dormant (lit. 'The Beauty Sleeping in the Wood') is the French title for Sleeping Beauty.

La Belle au bois dormant may also refer to:

- La Belle au bois dormant (Carafa): 1825 opera by Michele Carafa
- La Belle au bois dormant (Lecocq): 1900 opéra comique by Charles Lecocq
- La Belle au bois dormant, another name for The Sleeping Beauty (ballet)
