= Hell's Belles (film) =

1969 film by Maury Dexter

- Theatrical release poster
- Directed by: Maury Dexter
- Written by: R.G. McMullen; James Gordon White
- Produced by: Maury Dexter
- Starring: Jeremy Slate; Adam Roarke; Jocelyn Lane
- Cinematography: Kenneth Peach
- Edited by: John F. Schreyer
- Music by: Les Baxter
- Distributed by: American International Pictures (AIP)
- Release date: April 16, 1969
- Running time: 95 minutes
- Country: United States
- Language: English

Hell's Belles (also known as The Girl in the Leather Suit) is a 1969 American biker film directed by Maury Dexter and starring Jeremy Slate, Adam Roarke, and Jocelyn Lane. It was written by R.G. McMullen and James Gordon White. A biker attempts to retrieve his stolen motorbike from a motorcycle gang. He is instead offered a biker girl in exchange for his bike.

== Plot ==
After winning a top motorbike in a race, biker Dan has it stolen by Tony, a jealous competitor. Dan sets off to retrieve it and finds the bike is now in the hands of a motorcycle gang, led by Tampa, who has stolen it after beating up Tony.

After failing to steal his bike back and receiving a beating himself from Tampa, Dan heads off in pursuit of the gang and his bike, this time reluctantly accompanied by leather miniskirted biker girl Cathy who has been "gifted" to Dan by Tampa in exchange for the bike.

== Cast ==
- Jeremy Slate as Dan
- Adam Roarke as "Tampa"
- Jocelyn Lane as Cathy
- Angelique Pettyjohn as Cherry
- William Lucking as "Gippo"
- Michael Walker as Tony
- Jerry Randell as John "Crazy John"
- Astrid Warner as Piper
- Kristin Van Buren as Zelda

== Production ==
The film was shot around Tucson, Arizona.

== Reception ==
The Monthly Film Bulletin wrote: "Notwithstanding the title, the girls (most of whom manage to look uncannily like Nancy Sinatra) definitely take a back seat in this AIP cycle drama – a curious cross between The Wild Angels and the story of Frank James. The hero, who is nicknamed 'the cowboy' as much for his taste in hats as his nostalgia for the soil, even utters the ritual challenge ("You'd better kill me. Or so help me, I'll get every last one of you"); and once the chase leaves the highway for the desert dust, the film looks more than ever like a transposed Western. But though the Arizona locations are impressive and there is some fancy stunt-driving, the characters are so uniformly gross and inarticulate that the hero's sudden disclosure of his higher motives comes too late in the eighth reel to salvage any sympathy for him. Indeed, the near-monosyllabic script is delivered with such unvarying flatness that it is probably kindest to assume that the cast were selected for athletic rather than histrionic ability."

Variety wrote: "This surprisingly literate, generally well-acted bike-o-rama jumps to life under the persuasive direction of Maury Dexter, through the color lens of Ken Peach, and via some crisp dialogue by James Gordan White and R. G. McMullen. More, the film, which may be relegated to lesser viewing arenas because of bike typing, contains a moral."

Boxoffice wrote: "The picture, as produced and directed by Maury Dexter, has all the action and excitement that today's youth could want and the Berkey Pathe Color photography beautifully captures the rugged Arizona terrain. The script by James Gordon White and R. G. McMullen keeps the violence and sex to a minimum, relying instead on a well-developed story line. 'The film has no nudity and the main love scene fades out long before anything really happens. What violence that does take place is tastefully handled and logically incorporated into the action, not standing out as being included for strictly shock value as is so often the case today. The competent young cast is headed by seasoned 'cycle' picture actors Jeremy Slate and Adam Roarke and newcomer Jocelyn Lane. Miss Lane shows potential for future films, but here she occasionally seems self-conscious and sometimes appears to be imitating Nancy Sinatra (whom she strongly resembles). William Lucking has some outstanding moments as stupid Gippo."

== Home media ==
The film was released on DVD by MGM Home Entertainment as a double feature with The Wild Angels (1966).
