= The Two Foscari (Byron) =

1821 play by Lord Byron

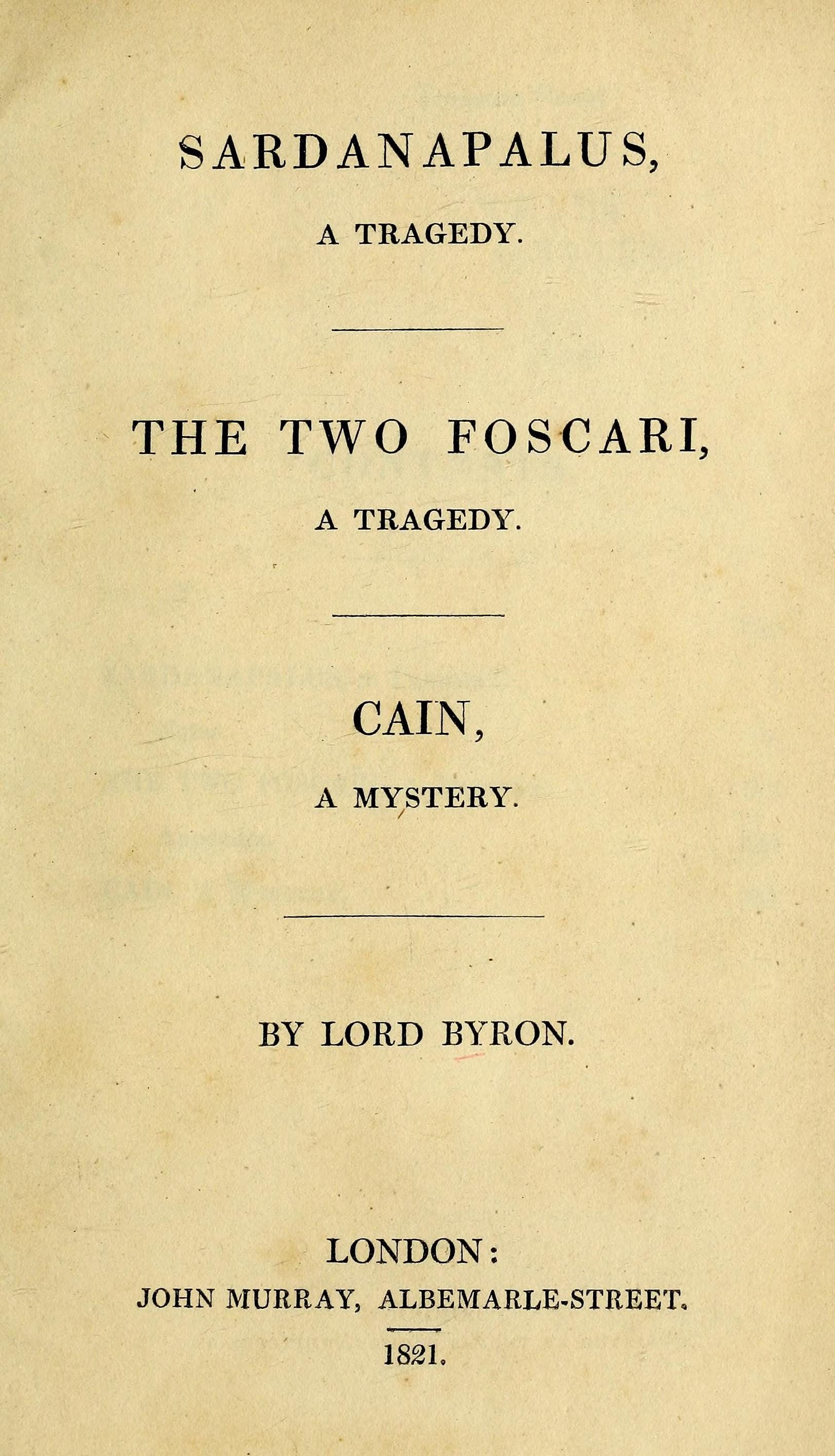
First edition title page. 1821.

The Two Foscari: An Historical Tragedy (1821) is a verse play in five acts by Lord Byron. The plot, set in Venice in the mid-15th century, is loosely based on the true story of the downfall of doge Francesco Foscari and his son Jacopo. Byron's play formed the basis of Verdi's opera I due Foscari.

The play was published by John Murray in 1821 in the same volume as his Sardanapalus and Cain

== Plot ==
In the Doge's Palace, Jacopo Foscari, already tortured once on the rack, has just fainted under a second session of the "Question". Giacomo Loredan, a powerful patrician whose father and uncle died mysteriously after crossing Jacopo's father, the Doge Francesco, drives the prosecution out of hereditary hatred; he literally keeps a ledger in which he has entered "Doge Foscari, my debtor for the deaths of Marco and Pietro Loredan, my sire and uncle". Barbarigo, a more reluctant member of the Council of Ten, tries in vain to moderate the proceedings. Jacopo, dragged half-conscious past a window overlooking the lagoon, laments the beauty of Venice and recalls his youthful days as a swimmer and gondolier. He insists he wrote the incriminating letter to the Duke of Milan only to provoke his own recall from Cretan exile; Venice, not freedom, is what he craves. He would rather die on Venetian soil than live anywhere else. Marina, his fierce and outspoken wife, storms into the palace demanding access to her husband; she is temporarily repulsed but later forces her way into the torture chamber itself, where Jacopo collapses again.

The Doge, having just signed a peace treaty ending decades of war, receives Marina. She begs to accompany Jacopo wherever he is sent next. The Doge, bound by his oath and by the iron etiquette of the Venetian constitution, can promise nothing. Loredan arrives with the Ten's new sentence: without further torture, Jacopo is banished for life back to Crete. Marina may go with him, an unexpected concession extracted only because Loredan, who "wars not with women", does not oppose it. The children, however, must remain in Venice as wards of the State. Marina rails against the Ten as demons; the Doge, stoical to the point of numbness, reminds her that Venice was built on the sacrifice of individual feeling to the collective will.

In Jacopo's subterranean prison beneath the palace (a cell open to the fetid canal water), he and Marina are briefly reunited. Jacopo carves his name on the wall among those of earlier prisoners, some of whom simply disappeared. He confesses that exile in Crete nearly destroyed his mind; he prefers death in Venice to life abroad. Marina vows to accompany him, leaving their children behind if necessary. Loredan enters to confirm the sentence and coldly trades insults with Marina. The Doge arrives for a last embrace with his son. Jacopo, supported by his father and wife, is led away toward the waiting galley.

As the Foscari family take their final leave of one another in a palace hall, Jacopo begs for some fixed date when he may return. The Doge refuses to look beyond the law. Suddenly Jacopo falters, clutches his heart, and dies in his father's and wife's arms; whether from the lingering effects of torture, despair, or sheer heartbreak is left ambiguous. Marina, half-mad with grief, accuses Loredan of murder when blood appears on Jacopo's lips in Loredan's presence (a folk belief that a corpse bleeds at the touch or sight of its killer). The Doge, for the first time openly broken, cradles his son's body and declares, "He's free". Loredan and Barbarigo, entering on other business, learn that the Council has already resolved to force the Doge's abdication while his son still lived.

The next day, a deputation from the Ten and a special giunta formally demand Francesco's resignation, offering a generous pension and citing his advanced age. The Doge reminds them that twice before he had asked to abdicate and been refused; he had even sworn an oath never to renew the request. He rejects their demand. When they pronounce a decree deposing him anyway, he instantly removes the ducal ring and cap, declaring, "The Adriatic's free to wed another". He insists on leaving the palace publicly by the Giants' Stairs on which he was invested thirty-five years earlier. As the great bell of St Mark's begins tolling for his successor Pasquale Malipiero, the sound, heard only once before in his life, at his own election, overwhelms him. Offered water, he pointedly takes the goblet from Loredan's hand (alluding to the rumour that Venetian crystal shatters if poisoned). He drinks, stands erect, refuses all support, and declares, "A Sovereign should die standing". At the tolling of the bell he collapses and dies. Marina bitterly rejects the Ten's offer of a princely state funeral, calling it the final hypocrisy. Loredan, closing his ledger, calmly writes beside the Foscari entry: "Paid".

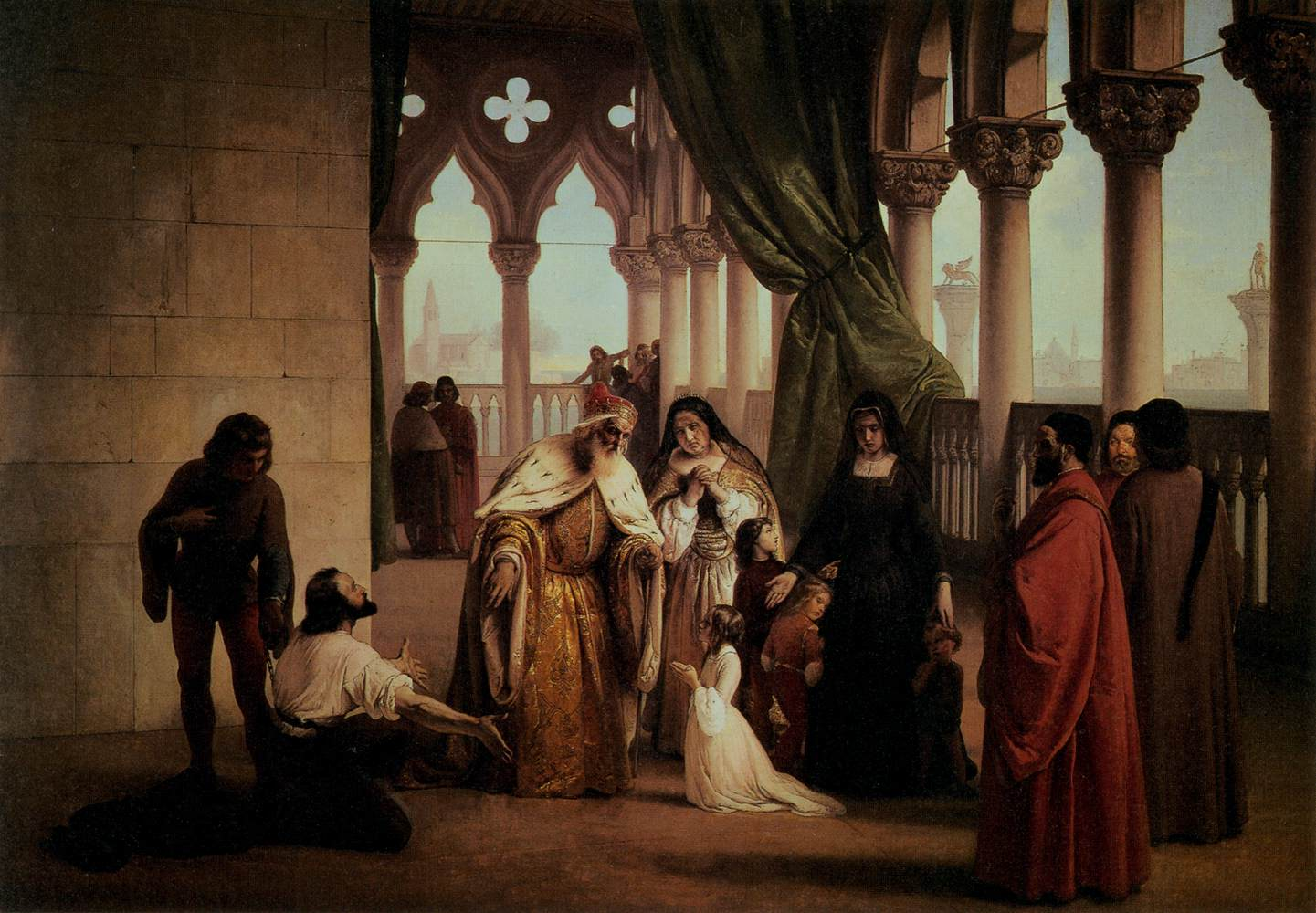
Francesco Foscari banishing his son Jacopo on the charge of treasonable correspondence while in exile. Painting by Francesco Hayez, circa 1852.

== Composition and publication ==
Byron wrote The Two Foscari in Ravenna in less than a month, between 12 June and 9 July 1821. It was published by John Murray on 19 December 1821 in the same volume as his Sardanapalus and Cain. Byron originally intended to dedicate The Two Foscari to his friend Sir Walter Scott, but in the event he transferred that dedication to Cain and left Foscari without one. He added an appendix to The Two Foscari in which he launched a stinging attack on what he considered the hypocrisies of the Poet Laureate, Robert Southey. Southey responded in a letter to a London newspaper in which he dared Byron to attack him again. Byron initially wanted to challenge Southey to a duel, but then turned instead to poetry and wrote his stinging satire The Vision of Judgment.

== The Two Foscari in other media ==
Verdi's opera I due Foscari, with a libretto by Francesco Maria Piave, was based on Byron's play. It also inspired two paintings, Les deux Foscari by Delacroix, and L'ultimo abboccamento di Jacopo Foscari con la propria famiglia prima di partire per l'esilio cui era stato condannato by Francesco Hayez.
