= Anacyndaraxes =

Anacyndaraxes (Greek: Ἀνακυνδαράξης) was the legendary father of Sardanapalus, king of Assyria. In the Deipnosophistae, he is called Anabaraxares by Athenaeus of Naucratis.

== Identification ==
In the Haydock Biblical Commentary, Antoine Augustin Calmet identifies him with Phul, king of Assyria from 2 Kings 15:19. However, since Sardanapalus has been identified with Ashurbanipal, it is perhaps more likely that "Anacyndaraxes" is a corruption of Esarhaddon.
