= The Death of Sardanapalus =

1827 painting by Eugène Delacroix

- La Mort de Sardanapale (French)
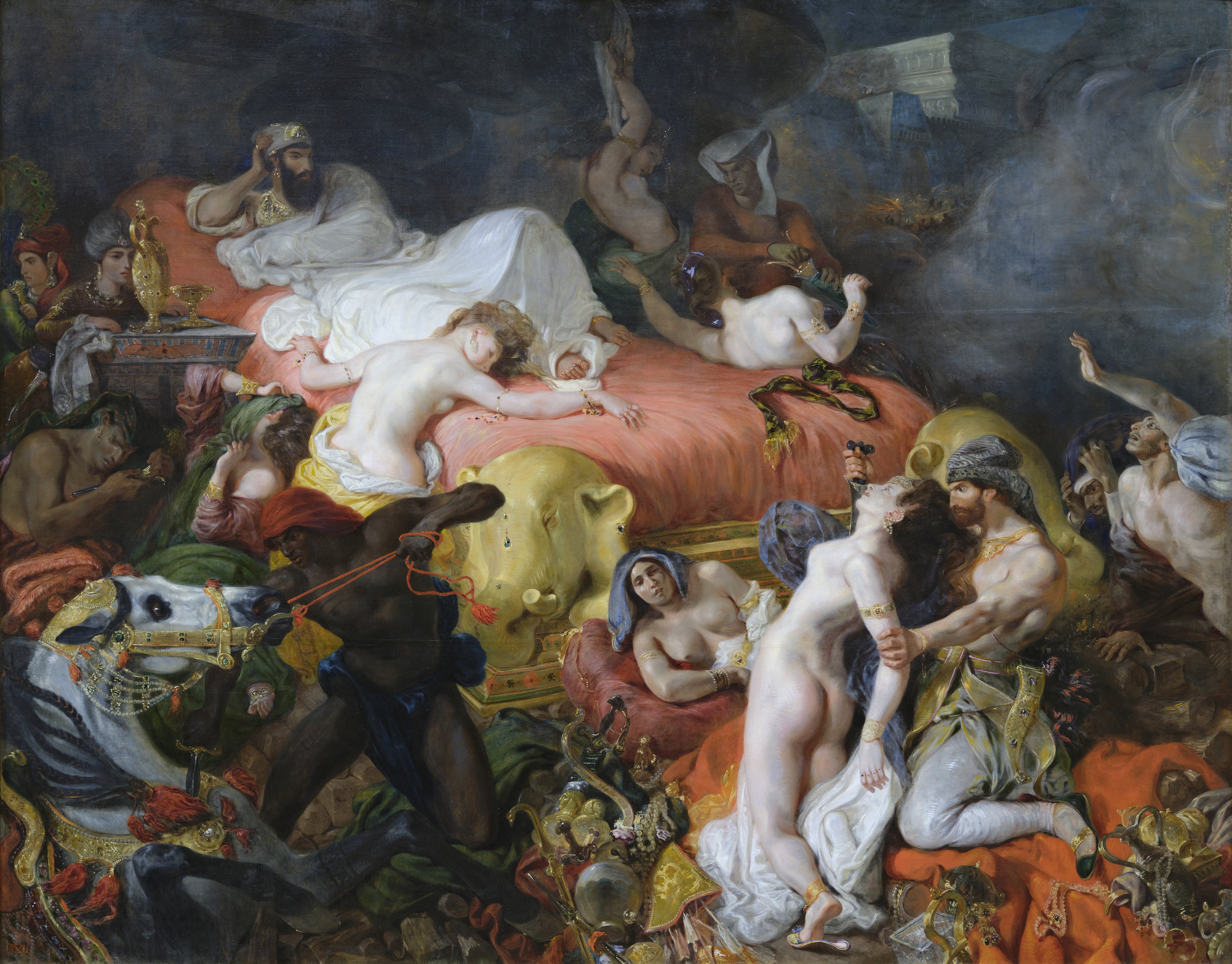
- Artist: Eugène Delacroix
- Year: 1827 and 1844
- Medium: Oil on canvas
- Dimensions: 392 cm × 496 cm (154 in × 195 in) and 73.71 cm × 82.47 cm (29.02 in × 32.47 in)
- Location: Musée du Louvre, Paris and Philadelphia Museum of Art

The Death of Sardanapalus (La Mort de Sardanapale) is an 1827 oil painting on canvas by the French artist Eugène Delacroix, now in the Musée du Louvre, Paris. A smaller replica he made in 1844 is in the Philadelphia Museum of Art. It is a work of Romanticism based on the tale of Sardanapalus, a king of Assyria, from Greek historian Diodorus Siculus's library. It uses rich, vivid and warm colours and broad brushstrokes, was inspired by Lord Byron's play Sardanapalus (1821) and inspired a Hector Berlioz cantata, Sardanapale (1830), and an unfinished Franz Liszt opera, Sardanapalo (1845–1852).

== Visual analysis ==
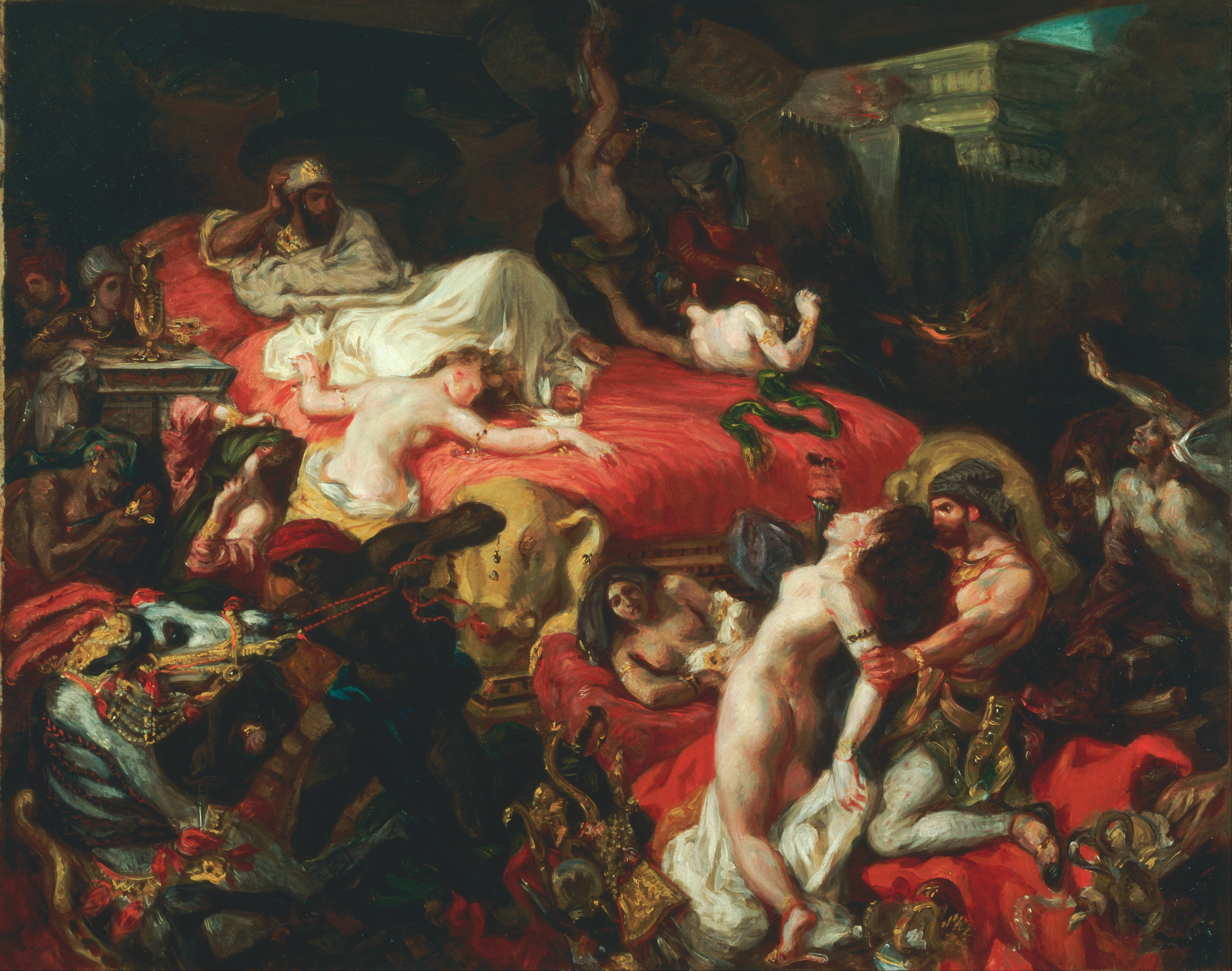
1844 version of the painting, 73.71 cm × 82.47 cm (29.02 in × 32.47 in), from Philadelphia Museum of Art.

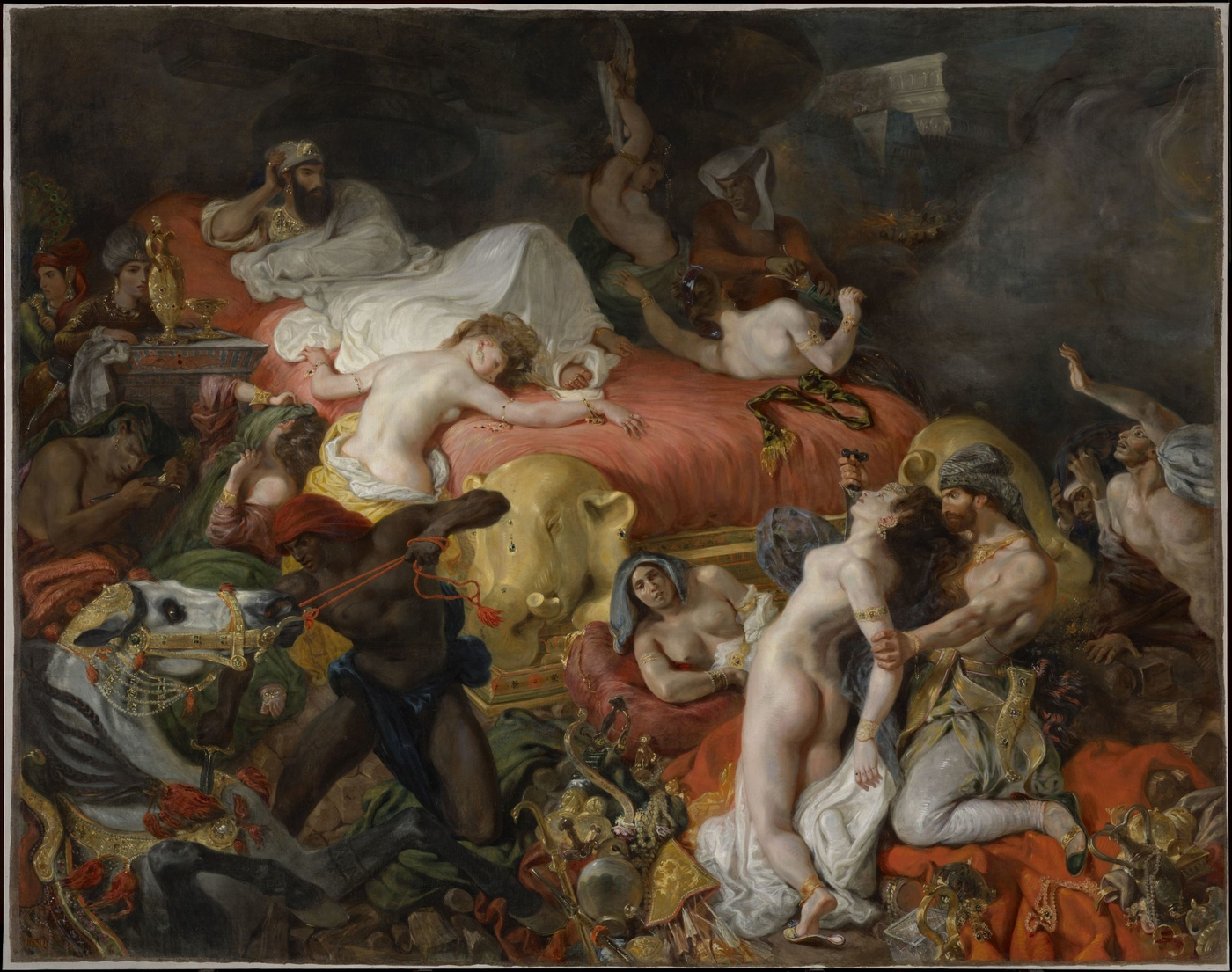
Eugène Delacroix La Mort de Sardanapale, 392 cm × 496 cm (154 in × 195 in), from the Louvre

External videos
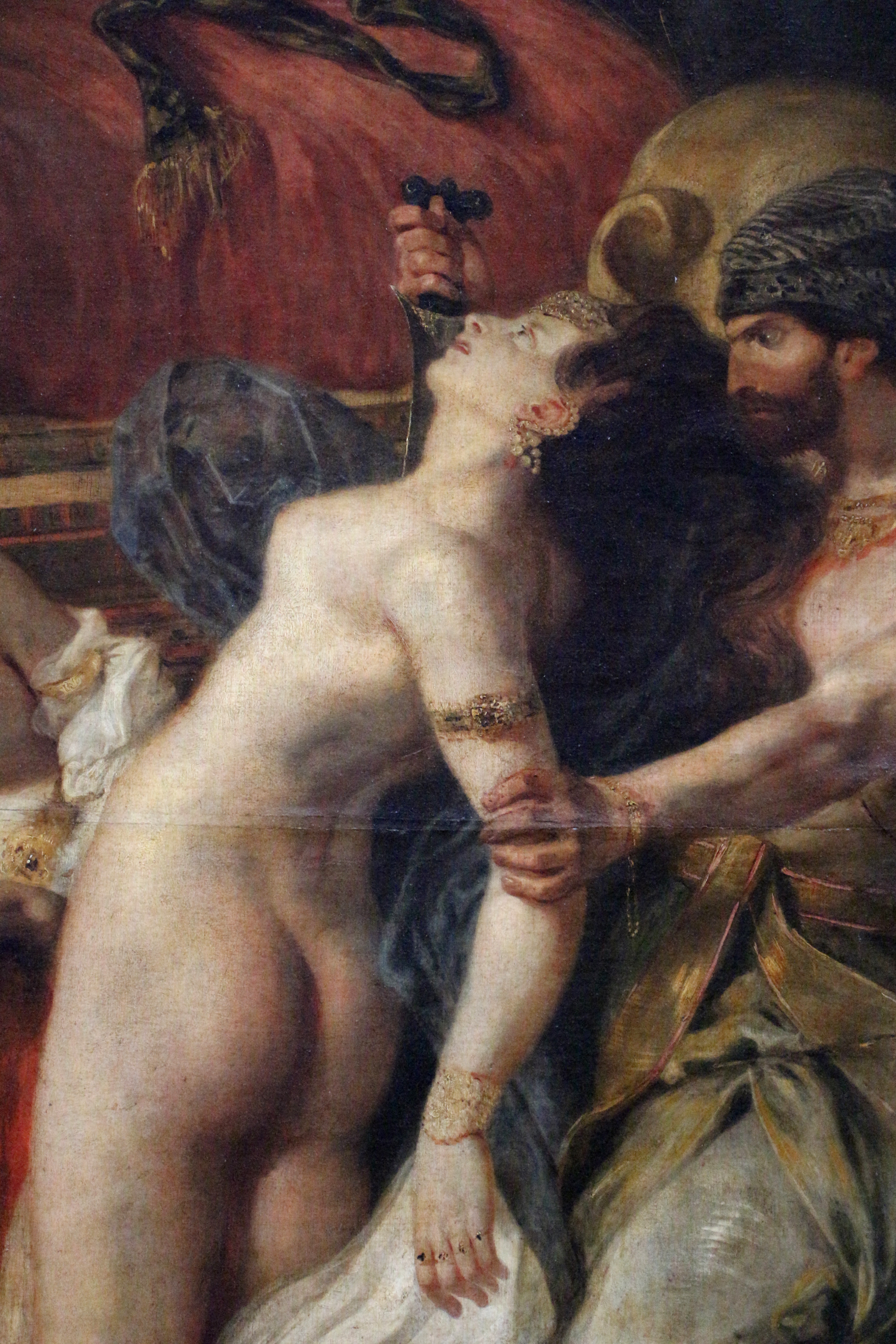
- Delacroix's The Death of Sardanapalus, Smarthistory

The main focus of Death of Sardanapalus is a large bed draped in rich red fabric. On it lies a man with a disinterested eye overseeing a scene of chaos. He is dressed in flowing white fabrics and sumptuous gold around his neck and head. A woman lies dead at his feet, prone across the lower half of the large bed. She is one of six in the scene, all in various shades of undress, and all in assorted throes of death by the hands of the half dozen men in the scene.

Several people are being stabbed with knives and one man is dying from a self-inflicted wound from a sword, and a man in the left foreground is attempting to kill an intricately adorned horse. A young man by the king's right elbow is standing behind a side table which has an elaborate golden decanter and a cup. There are golden elephant heads at the base of the bed, as well as various valuable trinkets scattered amongst the carnage. In the background, several architectural elements are visible but difficult to discern.

Delacroix used a painterly brushstroke in this painting, which allows for a strong sense of movement in the work. This scene is chaotic and violent, as showcased by the movement, weapons, and the colors used. The redness of the bed stands out against the somewhat obscured, dark background. The whiteness of Sardanapalus's robe, the creamy lines of the dying women's limbs, and the shimmers of gold objects throughout the scene pull the viewer's eye quickly around the painting.

There is asymmetry in the work, but the composition remains balanced. One woman reclined by an elephant head on the end of the bed is the only figure to engage with the viewer. Everyone else in the painting is focused on the task at hand: death.

== Reception ==
Death of Sardanapalus was controversial and polarizing at its exhibition at the Paris Salon of 1827. Delacroix's main figural subject was Sardanapalus, a king willing to destroy all of his possessions, including people and luxurious goods, in a funerary pyre of gore and excess. He was not a classical hero, like the Horatii in Jacques-Louis David’s eponymous painting. An antithesis of neoclassical traditions, which favored subdued colors, rigid space and an overall moral subject matter, it uses foreshortening to tilt the death scene directly into the space of the audience, a far cry from the subdued order of traditional academic paintings. Dorothy Bussy quotes one critic of the work as calling the painting "the fanaticism of ugliness" when it appeared in the Salon in 1827.

Art historian Linda Nochlin has argued that this painting scandalized the Salon because it was understood by contemporaries as a destructive sexual fantasy of Delacroix's own—a collapse of the distinction between the "Other" of Orientalism (i.e., Sardanapalus) and western man.

The composer Franz Liszt was inspired by Delacroix's painting (and Byron's play) to compose an Italian opera—Sardanapalo—on the topic, telling Princess Cristina Belgiojoso that, in view of the king's self-immolation, his finale will aim to 'set the entire audience alight'. He completed Act 1 only in 1852 and abandoned the project thereafter. The completed first act received its premiere in 2018.

The painting features prominently in the poet Paul Claudel's 1946 work Le Renoncement de Saint François, in which Francis' attitude toward beauty and pleasure is compared to that of Delacroix and his subject, Sardanapole: "From the most beautiful things the earth has to offer, neither the painter nor his model managed to make anything but a mess."

== See also ==
- The Destroyed Room – a photograph inspired by the painting
