= Cain (play) =

Play by Byron (1821)

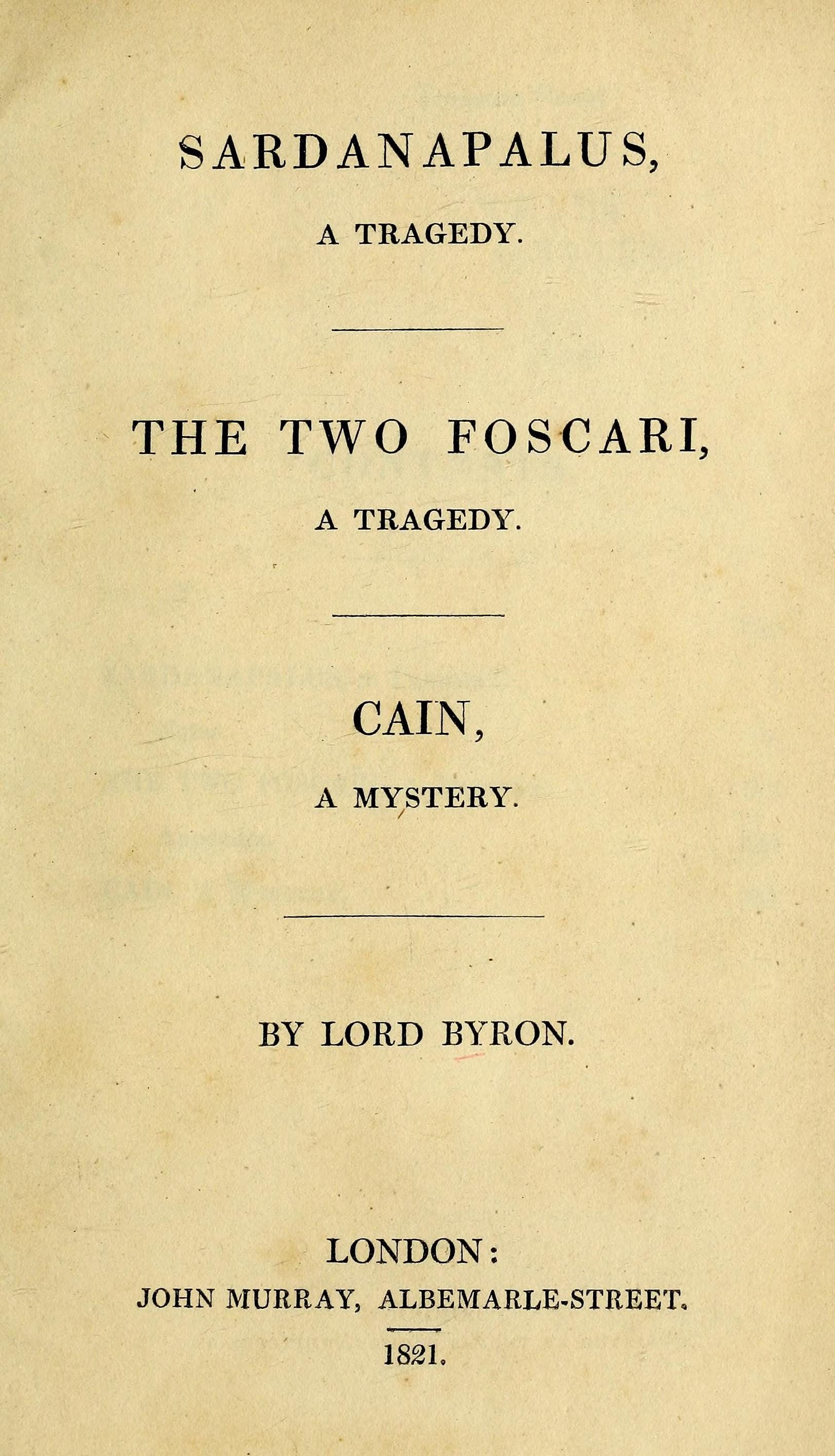
First edition title page, 1821

Cain is a dramatic work by Lord Byron published in 1821 in London by John Murray.

In Cain, originally published with Sardanapalus and The Two Foscari, Byron dramatizes the story of Cain and Abel from Cain's point of view. Cain is an example of the literary genre known as closet drama. The play was dedicated to Sir Walter Scott.

The work was published separately in 1822 by H. Gray.

== Characters ==
- Adam
- Eve
- Cain, their first son
- Abel, their second son
- Adah, Cain's sister and wife
- Zillah, Abel's sister and wife
- Lucifer
- Angel of the Lord

== Summary ==
The play commences with Cain refusing to participate in his family's prayer of thanksgiving to God. Cain tells his father he has nothing to thank God for because he is fated to die.

As Cain explains in an early soliloquy, he regards his mortality as an unjust punishment for Adam and Eve's transgression in the Garden of Eden, an event detailed in the Book of Genesis. Cain's anxiety over his mortality is heightened by the fact that he does not know what death is.

At one point in Act I, he recalls keeping watch at night for the arrival of death, which he imagines to be an anthropomorphic entity. The character who supplies Cain with knowledge of death is Lucifer.

In Act II, Lucifer leads Cain on a voyage to the "Abyss of Space" and shows him a catastrophic vision of the Earth's natural history, complete with spirits of extinct life forms like the mammoth.

Cain returns to Earth in Act III, depressed by this vision of universal death. At the climax of the play, Cain murders Abel. The play concludes with Cain's banishment.

== Literary influences ==
Perhaps the most important literary influence on Cain was John Milton's epic poem Paradise Lost, which tells of the creation and fall of mankind. For Byron as for many Romantic poets, the hero of Paradise Lost was Satan, and Cain is modelled in part on Milton's defiant protagonist. Furthermore, Cain's vision of the Earth's natural history in Act II is a parody of Adam's consolatory vision of the history of man (culminating in the coming and sacrifice of Christ) presented by the Archangel Michael in Books XI and XII of Milton's epic. In the preface to Cain, Byron attempts to downplay the influence of poems "upon similar topics", but the way he refers to Paradise Lost suggests its formative influence: "Since I was twenty, I have never read Milton; but I had read him so frequently before, that this may make little difference."

Another influence was medieval mystery plays, "the ancient title annexed to dramas upon similar subjects," though it is unclear the extent to which he would have read these.

== Other influences ==
As Byron himself notes in the preface to Cain, Cain's vision in Act II was inspired by the theory of catastrophism. In an attempt to explain large gaps in the fossil record, catastrophists posited that the history of the Earth was punctuated with violent upheavals that had destroyed its flora and fauna. Byron read about catastrophism in an 1813 English translation of some early work by French natural historian Georges Cuvier. Other influences include The Divine Legation of Moses by William Warburton and A Philosophical Enquiry into the Origin of Our Ideas of the Sublime and Beautiful by Edmund Burke.
