= William Lucking =

American actor (1941–2021)

- Lucking as Piney Winston in Sons of Anarchy
- Born: June 17, 1941; Vicksburg, Michigan, U.S.
- Died: October 18, 2021 (aged 80); Las Vegas, Nevada, U.S.
- Occupation: Actor
- Years active: 1968–2014
- Spouses: Marycarolyn Hawkins (m. 1965; died 1995) Sigrid Insull (m. 1996)
- Children: 2

William Lucking (June 17, 1941 – October 18, 2021) was an American film, television, and stage actor, best known for his role as Piney Winston in Sons of Anarchy (2008–2011), and for his movie roles in The Magnificent Seven Ride! (1972), and The Rundown (2003). He was also known for his portrayal of Col. Lynch in the first season of the 1980s TV show The A-Team.

== Career ==
=== Film and television ===
The Vicksburg, Michigan native has played tough bikers in Hell's Belles (1969) and Wild Rovers (1971), craggy cowboys in The Magnificent Seven Ride! (1972) and The Return of a Man Called Horse (1976), and determined military and police officers in Doc Savage: The Man of Bronze (1975) and K-PAX (2001). His other film work includes appearances in Oklahoma Crude (1973), The Crazy World of Julius Vrooder (1974), 10 (1979), The French Atlantic Affair (1979), Captain America II: Death Too Soon (1979), The Ninth Configuration (1980), The Mountain Men (1980), Coast to Coast (1980), Stripes (1981), Ladykillers (1988), False Identity (1990), Extreme Justice (1993), The River Wild (1994), The Limey (1999), Erin Brockovich (2000), Red Dragon (2002), The Rundown (2003), The World's Fastest Indian (2005), and Contraband (2012).

On television, he has had starring or featured roles in Outlaws as Harland Pike, The A-Team as Colonel Lynch, and the aforementioned Sons of Anarchy. He has appeared on such television series as Mission: Impossible, The Partridge Family, Simon & Simon, Bonanza, Kung Fu, Baa Baa Black Sheep, Gunsmoke, The Rockford Files, The Waltons, The Incredible Hulk, Knight Rider, Hart to Hart, Magnum, P.I., M*A*S*H, Hunter, In the Heat of the Night, The Greatest American Hero, Murder, She Wrote, NYPD Blue, Star Trek: Deep Space Nine, JAG, Walker, Texas Ranger, The X Files, ER, The Pretender, Profiler, The West Wing, Cold Case, Tales of the Gold Monkey, Star Trek: Enterprise and The Young Riders, among other television shows.

=== Theater ===
Lucking graduated from UCLA and the Pasadena Playhouse with degrees in literature and theater. In 1986, with fellow actor and Michigan native Dana Elcar, he co-founded the Santa Paula Theater Center.

As co-instructor of the company's free acting workshop he was admired for his minimalist approach; a counterpoint to Elcar's methodical style. He served alongside Elcar as artistic director for five seasons. He produced such projects as Edward Albee's The Zoo Story, Harold Pinter's The Hothouse, George Bernard Shaw's Major Barbara, Tennessee Williams' Camino Real, and Robert Penn Warren's All the King's Men. His most recent stage roles include Blue in the CTG/Ahmanson production of Conversations with My Father at the Doolittle Theater in Los Angeles and Dr. Sloper in the Ensemble Theater Company of Santa Barbara's production of The Heiress.

== Personal life and death ==
Lucking was married to his first wife, Marycarolyn "Mimi" Hawkins from 1965 until her death from cancer in 1995. He and Mimi had 2 daughters, Marjet Lucking and Juliana Lucking Ryan. Lucking was married to his second wife, Sigrid Insull, a costume designer from 1996 until his death in 2021. Lucking died at his home in Las Vegas, Nevada, on October 18, 2021, at the age of 80.

== Filmography ==
Year	Title	Role	Notes
1969	Hell's Belles	Gippo	
1971	Wild Rovers	Ruff	
1971	The Todd Killings		
1971	Harold and Maude	Motorcycle Officer	Uncredited
1972	The Magnificent Seven Ride!	Walt Drummond	
1973	Oklahoma Crude	Marion	
1974	Chopper One	Deetzer	Episode: "Ambush"
1974	The Crazy World of Julius Vrooder	Harmer	
1975	Doc Savage: The Man of Bronze	Renny	
1975	Police Woman	Charlie Joe Lightfoot (as Bill Lucking)	1 episode
1976	Birch Interval	Charlie	
1976	The Return of a Man Called Horse	Tom Gryce	
1979	10	Policeman	
1979	The French Atlantic Affair	Don Crawford	3 episodes
1979	Captain America II: Death Too Soon	Stader	TV movie
1980	The Ninth Configuration	Highway Patrolman	
1980	The Mountain Men	Jim Walker	
1980	Coast to Coast	Jules	
1981	Stripes	Recruiter	
1982	M*A*S*H	Sgt. Marty Urbancic	Episode: "Sons & Bowlers"
1982	Knight Rider	Redmond	1 episode
1986	Outlaws	Harland Pike	Main Role
1988	Ladykillers	Captain Bucholtz	TV movie
1990	False Identity	Frank Calovich	
1992	Rescue Me	Kurt	
1992-1999	Star Trek: Deep Space Nine	Furel	
1993	Extreme Justice	Cusack	
1994	The River Wild	Frank	
1996	The Trigger Effect	Pharmacist	
1996	The Rich Man's Wife	Detective	Uncredited
1998	Judas Kiss	Wally	
1999	The Limey	Warehouse Foreman	
1999	The Last Best Sunday	Sheriff Weaks	
2000	Erin Brockovich	Bob Linwood	
2001	K-PAX	Sheriff	
2001-2005	Star Trek Enterprise	Harrad-Sar	
2002	Red Dragon	Byron Metcalf	
2003	The Rundown	Walker	
2005	The World's Fastest Indian	Rolly	
2007	Slipstream	Detective Buzz Larabee	
2008-2011	Sons of Anarchy	Piney Winston	
2012	Contraband	Bud Farraday	
