= Sardanapalo =

Unfinished opera by Franz Liszt

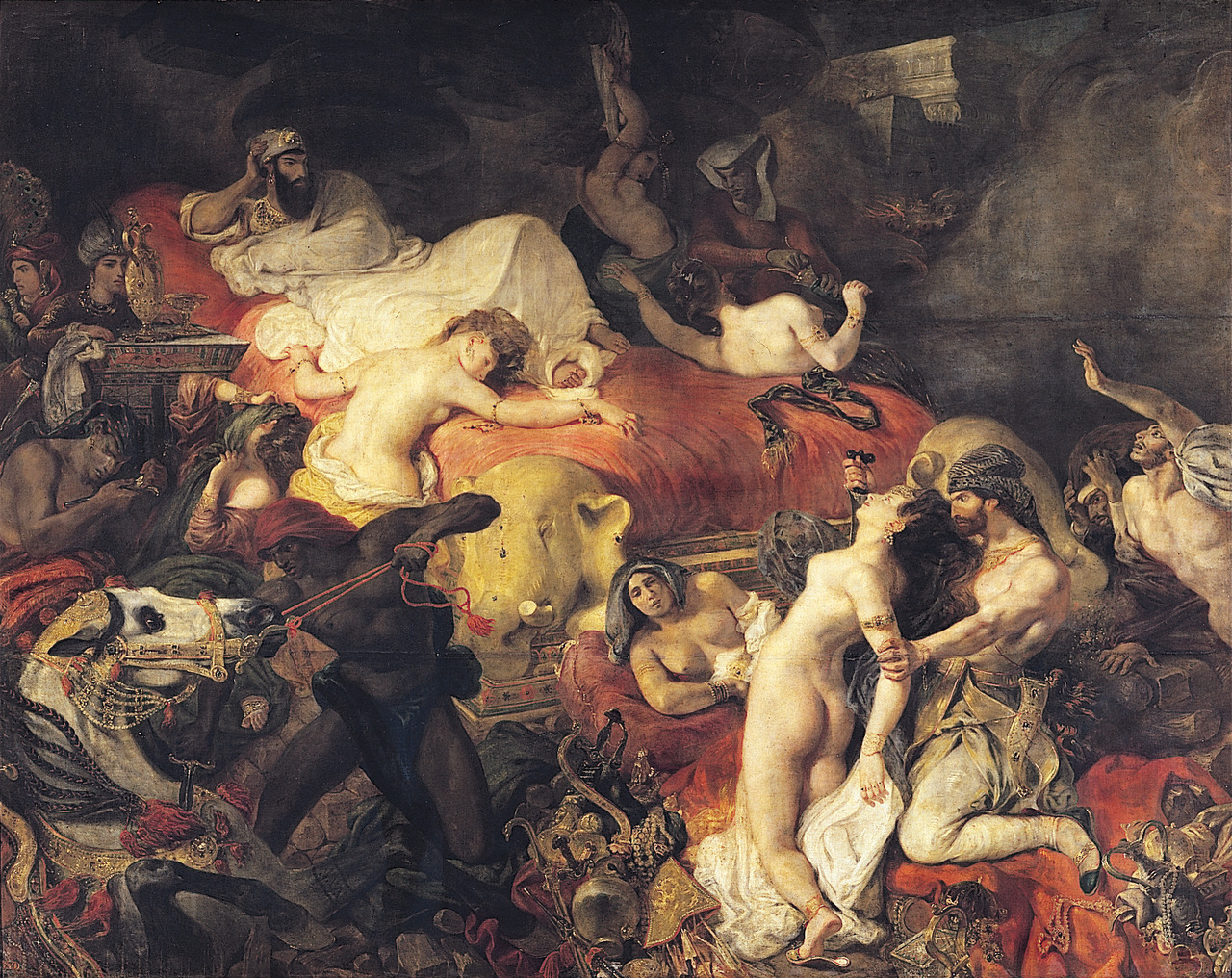
Eugène Delacroix's The Death of Sardanapalus (1827), which contributed to Liszt's treatment of the story in his opera

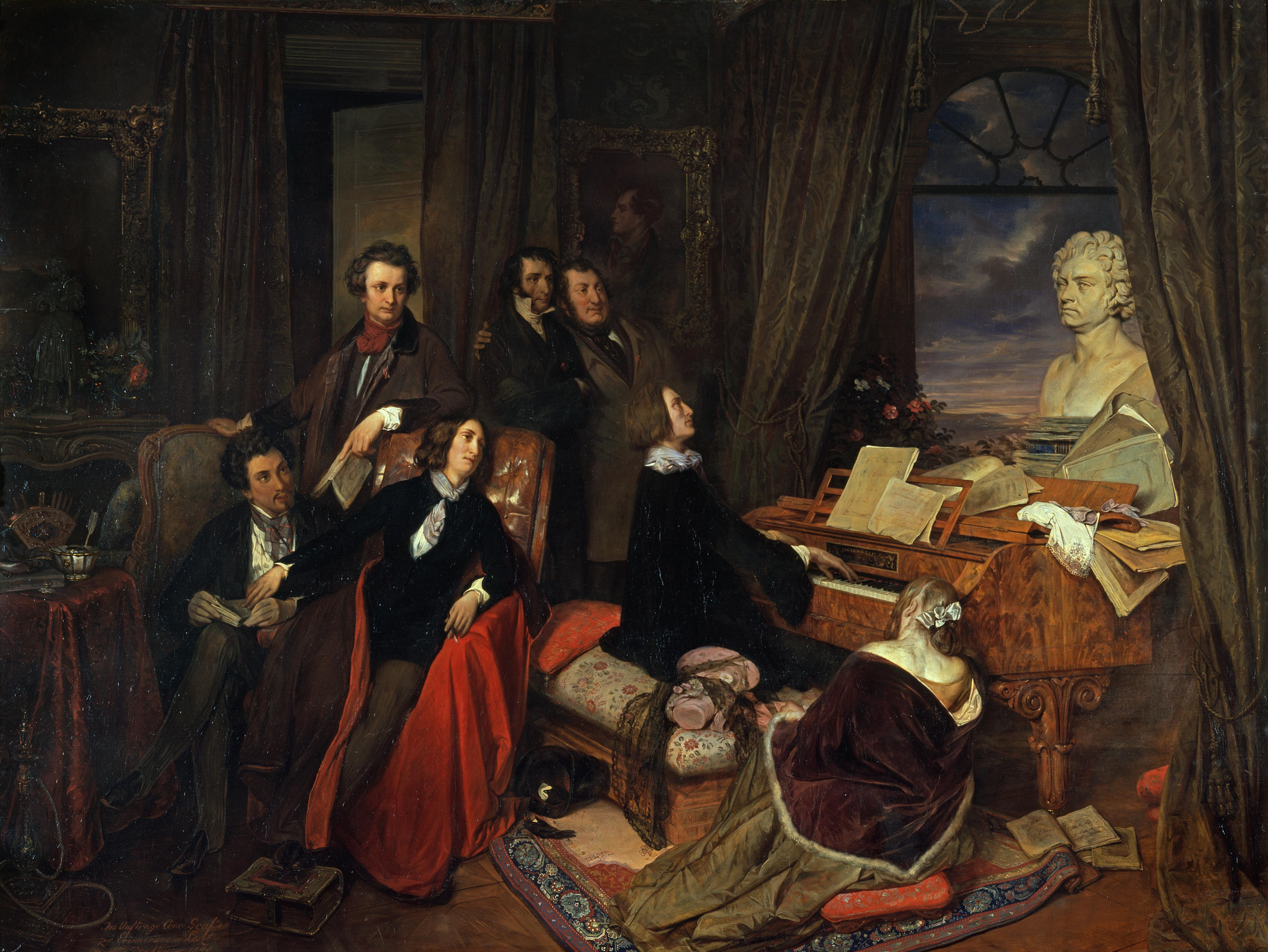
This well-known 1840 painting of Liszt at the Piano surrounded by musical contemporaries, by the artist Josef Danhauser, features on the rear wall a portrait of Lord Byron, author of Sardanapalus.

Sardanapalo or Sardanapale (Italian or French for Sardanapalus), S.687, is an unfinished opera by Franz Liszt based on the 1821 verse play Sardanapalus by Lord Byron. Liszt was ambitious for his project, and planned to dovetail his retirement as a virtuoso with the premiere of his opera. He worked on it intermittently between 1845 and 1852, once declaring it 'well on the way toward completion', but ceased work on it thereafter. The first act had been completed in a detailed, continuous short score, but there is no evidence of any music being notated for acts 2 and 3. As an Italian opera, it would almost certainly have been called Sardanapalo, though Liszt referred to it as Sardanapale in his French correspondence. The music Liszt completed remained unperformed until 2016 when British musicologist David Trippett first established the legibility of Liszt's N4 manuscript, and produced both a critical edition and realized an orchestral performing edition (after Liszt's own instrumental cues for orchestration). This received its world premiere in Weimar on 19 August 2018.

== Background ==
Liszt first mentions his desire to compose a large-scale opera in October 1841. Alongside his interest in the genre's capacity for realizing literary narratives in music, he was motivated, in part, by the prospect of being recognised as more than a travelling keyboard virtuoso; with Rossini's stature in mind, a major opera offered Liszt a way of entering "the musical guild". (His early one-act opera, Don Sanche, composed aged 13, closed after four performances at the Paris Opéra, and could hardly qualify to raise his status.) Among the range of opera subjects he considered, he initially settled on an opera based on Byron's The Corsair, and even obtained a libretto by Alexandre Dumas in 1844, but nothing came of this.

Towards the end of 1845 he settled on the subject of Byron's tragedy Sardanapalus (1821). At this time Liszt had been appointed at the court in Weimar, but had not yet taken up residence. He briefly considered a possible opportunity at the Hoftheater, Vienna, where the Kapellmeister, Gaetano Donizetti, was seriously ill (he would die in 1848). A large-scale Italian opera could have placed him in the running for Donizetti's influential post, as he wrote in an 1846 letter to the Comtesse d'Agoult. Yet he told her only a few months later that, given the conduct of the people involved, "that post will do me no good" and was no longer a consideration.

In correspondence with his close associate the Princess Belgiojoso, Liszt first planned to have the opera performed at La Scala, Milan, in 1846–47, later switching the venue to the Kärntnertor Theater in Vienna (1847), and finally to "Paris or London" (1852).

Sardanapalus was, according to the writer Ctesias, the last king of Assyria. Some have identified him with Assurbanipal, but the Sardanapalus of Ctesias, "an effeminate debauchee, sunk in luxury and sloth, who at the last was driven to take up arms, and, after a prolonged but ineffectual resistance, avoided capture by suicide" is not an identifiable historical character. Ctesias's tale (the original is lost) was preserved by Diodorus Siculus, and it is on this account that Byron based his play.

Liszt had been present at the second performance in 1830 of the oratorio The Death of Sardanapalus by Hector Berlioz, which featured an immolation scene, in preparation for which a "sacrifice of the innocents" took place, as famously depicted in Eugène Delacroix's sensational 1828 painting of the subject (illustration). These influences may have stoked Liszt's interest in the tale's potential for operatic treatment. With reference to the inferno that ends Byron's play, he tells Belgiojoso that his finale will "aim to set the entire audience alight". By 1849, when he at last began to write the music, he conceived the idea of further altering the libretto by adding an orgy scene, perhaps after Delacroix, but this was turned down by Belgiojoso.

== Finding a libretto ==
Liszt's librettist of choice, Félicien Mallefille, agreed to the commission and received a down-payment, but missed several deadlines and – when prompted by Liszt's assistant – requested additional funds. Growing frustrated at the delay, Liszt decided to end the agreement and move on. (Mallefille did finally submit a prose scenario, but it was too late for Liszt to consider continuing his planned collaboration with the Frenchman.) Belgiojoso then procured an unnamed Italian poet ("my nightingale") as the new librettist, a poet who was under house arrest at the time for agitating towards Italian independence. In December 1846, Liszt sent his assistant, Gaetano Belloni, to Paris with orders "to bring me back, dead or alive, a poem [libretto]"; he managed to deliver the first act, in Italian, on New Year's Day 1847. The remainder followed 18 months later, though Liszt wrote to Belgiojoso querying aspects of the text for acts 2 and 3. She replied with further suggestions, and it is unclear whether the correspondence continued. Liszt delayed for a time, perhaps awaiting revisions to acts 2 and 3, but began composing the first act in earnest around 11 April 1850.

Between April 1850 and December 1851 Liszt notated 110 pages of music (now in the Goethe- und Schiller-Archiv in Weimar, and digitised in 2019) and wrote to Richard Wagner that the opera would be ready for production in Paris or London in 1852. Liszt's assistant, Joachim Raff, notes in December 1851 that he would soon be asked to produce a provisional orchestration of the opera for Liszt, but this never took place. Shortly thereafter Liszt seems to have abandoned his work on the opera. It is possible that his diffidence resulted from reading Wagner's essay Opera and Drama, by whose criteria an Italian opera could have appeared somewhat outmoded (even as Liszt's ambition was expressly to modernise the genre, the better to translate a literary source into 'musical drama'). But Trippett has argued this was unlikely to have been a decisive factor, and suggested instead that Liszt's abandonment resulted from his concern over the libretto, and the fact that he never received a revised libretto for acts 2 and 3, so could not set these to music.

== Roles ==
Roles, voice types, premiere cast
| Role | Voice type | Premiere cast, 19 August 2018 Conductor: Kirill Karabits |
|---|---|---|
| Sardanapalo, King of Assyria | tenor | Airam Hernández |
| Mirra, an Ionian slavegirl | soprano | Joyce El-Khoury |
| Beleso, a priest | bass | Oleksandr Pushniak |
| Female chorus, concubines | soprano & alto | Chorus of the Deutsches Nationaltheater Weimar |

== Synopsis ==
=== Scene 1 ===
The royal palace at Nineveh. Evening.

A festival is underway. The women of the harem invite revellers to dance, with erotic intent. They surround Mirra, telling her to forget her troubles and revive her spirits through love ("the light and air speak of love / Come, rejoice in the shared joy"). Mirra is sad, nostalgic for her home in Greece and tearfully broken hearted ("Have no further thought for me! Leave!"). The women, undeterred, encourage her to enjoy her position as the king's favourite and embrace a life of "boundless ecstasy" enraptured by "angelic kisses".

=== Scene 2 ===
Mirra, unpersuaded, begs to be left alone, and the chorus departs. Now by herself, she daydreams of the lost happiness of her life in Ionia, prompted by the memory of her mother's smile. Awakening from the dream, she remonstrates at being torn in two directions ("a slave, alone, plaything of fate"): she loves the king deeply, yet is ridden with guilt, for it was he who conquered and destroyed her homeland. While a majority of his subjects don't respect him (owing to his effeminate, non-brutal ways), she closes the scene with a virtuosic cabaletta that celebrates the sincerity of her love for him ("my heart was blessed with indescribable contentment").

=== Scene 3 ===
The king enters, and—seeing Mirra's tears—seeks to comfort her. She says she has not the strength to tell him her woes and he should not ask her, but he implores her ("Speak! Speak! At hearing your voice I tremble with joy and hope"). At his repeated insistence, she explains only that theirs is an "ill-fated flame that brings nothing but shame and grief". At this the king chides her, leading to the exchange: Sard: "Do you love me?" Mirra: "Would that I could not!" The scene now turns, developing into a triumphant love duet. And the king, unaware of Mirra's complex motives, declares the strength and purity of their love ("let us love as long as the fervid age smiles upon us"), even as she notes only the lack of dignity her adulterous role carries.

=== Scene 4 ===
At the height of the lovers' passion, Beleso—an elder statesman—arrives suddenly, warning of war. He chides the king for not taking his role seriously, for forgetting his people's needs, and ignoring the "inner voice of duty". A band of rebel Satraps are readying forces against the empire, and Beleso invokes the ancient kings of Assyria in disgust ("witness the error of your successor, forgetting the sceptre for a base slave mistress") before urging the king to fight: "set aside the distaff, grasp the sword!" Sardanapalo hesitates, fearing that violence leads only to the suffering of innocents ("every glory is a lie, if it must be bought with the weeping of afflicted humankind"). In a lyric aside, Mirra wonders aloud why he is hesitating, and seeks to reawaken his noble valour through her sensuous appeal. Finally, he is persuaded, and agrees to resist the rebels with force. A closing trio sees the king growing more contented as military ruler, Mirra praising his new noble demeanour, and Beleso beating the drums of war as the army mobiles and begins to march into battle.

== First edition ==
Initial comments on Liszt's manuscript had declared it "a series of sketches" (1911). But in 2016, musicologist David Trippett discovered that the music and libretto are both decipherable and continuous, constituting the first act of Liszt's planned three-act opera. Two separate editions of Liszt's manuscript were published in 2019: a critical edition for the Neue Liszt Ausgabe, and an orchestrated performing edition (Schott) that draws critically on all Liszt's indications and cues for orchestration. No music or libretto text is known to exist for acts 2 and 3. The manuscript N4 was digitised and made available online by Klassik Stiftung Weimar in 2019.

In 2022, scholarly reviews of the critical edition appeared in the journal Notes and the Royal Musical Association Research Chronicle.

== Instrumentation ==
The performing edition of Sardanapalo is scored for 1 piccolo, 2 flutes, 2 oboes, 1 cor anglais, 2 clarinets, 1 bass clarinet, 2 bassoons, 1 contrabassoon, 4 horns, 3 trumpets, 2 trombones, 1 bass trombone, 1 tuba, percussion, 2 harps, strings.

== First recording and press reception ==
Sardanapalo (2019). Joyce El-Khoury (Mirra), Airam Hernández (King Sardanapalo), Oleksandr Pushniak (Beleso) Weimar Staatskapelle, conducted by Kirill Karabits. This recording was released on 8 February 2019 and arose from the world premiere performance in Weimar, 19–20 August 2018. Upon its release the recording received international critical acclaim, and became the best-selling classical CD (across all platforms) in the UK official charts.

The Times declared it "A torridly exciting recording ... It is not too big a statement to say that the work's emergence changes music history. ... You wonder what heights were left to breach in the unwritten acts. ... A most special and historic release"

Gramophone awarded it 'Editor's Choice' declaring it: "immensely important ... the act is beautifully shaped, while Liszt's fluid treatment of bel canto structures reveals an assured musical dramatist at work. Trippett has carefully modelled his orchestration on Liszt's works on the 1850s, and it sounds unquestionably authentic. A fine work by one of the most inventive of composers."

For The Guardian it was "a lost opera of glittering scope", The Sunday Times (Album of the week) spoke of "rip-roaring stuff, characteristic of the dramatic orchestral narratives of the composer's neglected tone poems", and Opera Now (Critics Choice) declared it "lush and Romantic to a fault, with long-spun melodies, an innate sense of dramatic thrust and some thrilling choral work. ... Liszt does forge his own voice."

The New York Times, responding to a fragment released in 2017, spoke of Liszt's "white-hot aria ... The music is a great tide of chromatic lushness".

Bachtrack wrote of "an entirely convincing drama, packed with incident and bursting with thrilling vocal and orchestral colour – think Bellini reimagined by Wagner and you have some idea of the vast emotional sweep of this gripping music."

In December 2019 it was listed in The Guardian's Top 10 Classical CDs of 2019, in Gramophone's Recordings of the Year, and was awarded 'Recording of the Year' in the category 'Premiere Recording (rediscovery / reconstruction)' by Presto Classical.

== First staging ==
The premiere staging of Sardanapalo is scheduled for March 2027 at the Hungarian State Opera, conducted by János Kovács and directed by Mária Harangi.
