= Extreme Justice (film) =

1993 American film by Mark L. Lester

- Theatrical release poster
- Directed by: Mark L. Lester
- Written by: Frank Sacks; Robert Boris
- Produced by: Frank Sacks
- Starring: Lou Diamond Phillips; Scott Glenn; Chelsea Field; Yaphet Kotto; Andrew Divoff; Richard Grove; William Lucking; Ed Lauter
- Cinematography: Mark Irwin
- Edited by: Donn Aron
- Music by: David Michael Frank
- Distributed by: Trimark Pictures
- Release dates: May 5, 1993 (Philippines); June 26, 1993 (United States)
- Running time: 96 minutes
- Country: United States
- Language: English
- Budget: $8 million

Extreme Justice is a 1993 American crime action thriller film directed by Mark L. Lester and starring Lou Diamond Phillips, Scott Glenn, and Chelsea Field. Originally intended to be released theatrically in April 1993, Trimark Pictures cancelled its release due to the 1992 Los Angeles riots and shifted the film to air on HBO on June 26, 1993; the film was first theatrically released in the Philippines on May 5, 1993.

== Plot ==
After an incident where he used questionable police tactics, Jeff Powers is placed on probation. Upon hearing of his probation, a friend from the force later invites Jeff to join the Special Investigation Section, an elite and highly secretive Los Angeles Police Department(LAPD) unit designed to track and shut down high-profile criminals. Jeff discovers that the group is actually a group of rogue cops who actually function like an unofficially sanctioned death squad, and are given wide latitude in dealing with criminals. Although their official mission is to survey criminals and arrest them in the act of committing a crime, the squad often resorts to brutality and murder to dispatch the subjects they are supposed to arrest.

Jeff questions the purpose of the squad and begins to see them as more of a harm to society than a positive force for justice. When he tries to bring evidence of the squad's abuse of power, he learns that the squad is protected by well-connected and very influential people who already know and condone the squad's methods. Jeff's former teammates in the squad begin to suspect that Jeff has turned on them and decide to take measures to eliminate him before he can expose their activities to the public.

== Cast ==
- Lou Diamond Phillips as Detective Jeff Powers
- Scott Glenn as Detective Dan Vaughn
- Chelsea Field as Kelly Daniels
- Yaphet Kotto as Detective Larson
- Andrew Divoff as Angel
- Richard Grove as Detective Mike Lloyd
- Ed Lauter as Captain Shafer
- William Lucking as Cusak
- L. Scott Caldwell as Devlin
- Paul Ben-Victor as Councilman Joe Taylor
- Larry Holt as Reese
- Daniel Quinn as Bobby Lewis, The Surfer
- Thomas Rosales Jr. as Chavez (credited as Tom Rosales)
- Ed Frias as Herrera
- Jay Arlen Jones as Nash
- Adam Gifford as Speer (credited as G. Adam Gifford)
- Jophery Brown as Vince
- Stephen Root as Max Alvarez
- Sonia Lopes as Rosa Rodrigues
- Ramón Franco as Alberto Torres (uncredited)
- William McNamara as Mark Franklin (uncredited)

== Production ==
Lester said the film was based on real incidents saying the police "would wait around until after a crime had been committed, and wouldn't arrest people til later. My favorite scene is where someone is being raped and they're just waiting in the car until the rape's over, then they move in. That's what they would do: let the criminals rob the bank, then kill them as they left." Lester said he made the film with deliberately ambiguous leads "so some people can watch it and say 'they're doing a really good thing' while others can say 'they're really not.'"
