= Jocelyn Lane =

British actress and model (born 1937)

- Born: Jocelyn Olga Bolton; 16 May 1937 (age 89); Vienna, Austria
- Other name: Jackie Lane
- Occupations: Actress; model
- Years active: 1954–1971
- Spouse: Prince Alfonso of Hohenlohe-Langenburg (m. 1973; div. 1985)
- Children: Princess Arriana of Hohenlohe-Langenburg (b. 1975)
- Parents: Briton John Bolton (father); Olga Mironova (mother)

Jocelyn "Jackie" Lane (born 16 May 1937) is a British actress and model of the 1950s and 1960s. She was married to Prince Alfonso of Hohenlohe-Langenburg.

== Early life ==
Lane was born as Jocelyn Olga Bolton in Vienna, Austria in 1937. She is the youngest daughter of Russian-born pianist mother Olga Mironova and English father Briton John Bolton, who worked for an American oil firm; he later died in a car crash in the US. She was educated in New Rochelle, New York, in the United States. At the age of 14, she moved to Britain, where she received dance training. Her older sister Mara Lane was also a model and actress in the 1950s.

== Career ==
Lane established herself as a model in the United Kingdom by the time she was 18, using the pseudonym Jackie Lane. She appeared in several British films beginning in 1955 with a travelogue April in Portugal. One of her most striking film roles in the 1950s was as the second female lead in These Dangerous Years (1957), directed by Herbert Wilcox and starring Frankie Vaughan. As Lane was confused with another actress named Jackie Lane (known for starring in Doctor Who), she began to be credited with her full first name when she moved to Hollywood in 1964. Her resemblance to Brigitte Bardot was widely remarked upon. She was featured in the September 1966 issue of Playboy magazine.

In 1965, she co-starred with Elvis Presley in Tickle Me and later appeared in several roles in Hollywood films, including as "biker chick" Cathy in Hell's Belles in 1969. She also made guest appearances on American television series. She retired in 1971 before marrying Prince Alfonso of Hohenlohe-Langenburg in Marbella, Spain on 3 May 1973.

== Personal life ==
Lane gave birth to Princess Arriana Theresa Maria of Hohenlohe-Langenburg, her only child, in 1975. In 1985, her marriage to Prince Alfonso ended in a divorce, and she received a million-dollar settlement. She claimed that the sum was "not really fitting for a princess".

Lane designs feather necklaces marketed as Princess J Feather Collection in California and London.

== Filmography ==
=== Film appearances ===
Year	Title	Role	Other notes
1954	The Men of Sherwood Forest	Mary, the bar wench	Uncredited
1954	For Better, for Worse		Uncredited
1955	April in Portugal	Travel Guide	As Jackie Lane
1956	The Gamma People	Anna	As Jackie Lane
1957	These Dangerous Years	Maureen	As Jackie Lane
1957	The Truth About Women	Saida	As Jackie Lane
1958	Wonderful Things!	Pepita	As Jackie Lane
1959	The Angry Hills	Maria Tassos	As Jackie Lane
1959	Jet Storm	Clara Forrester	As Jackie Lane
1960	Howlers in the Dock	Twin Sister	As Jackie Lane
1960	Mit Himbeergeist geht alles besser	Chou-Chou	As Jackie Lane
1960	Robin Hood and the Pirates	Kareen Blain	As Jackie Lane
1961	Goodbye Again	First Maisie	As Jackie Lane
1961	Two and Two Make Six	Julie	As Jackie Lane
1962	Operation Snatch	Bianca Tabori	As Jackie Lane
1962	The Son of Hercules vs. Venus	Daphne	As Jackie Lane
1962	Tromboni di Fra Diavolo	Cristina Forzano	As Jackie Lane
1962	War Gods of Babylon	Mirra	As Jackie Lane
1965	The Sword of Ali Baba	Princess Amara	
1965	Tickle Me	Pamela Meritt	
1965	Incident at Phantom Hill	Memphis	
1966	The Poppy Is Also a Flower	Society photographer	
1966	How to Seduce a Playboy	Ginette	
1969	Hell's Belles	Cathy	
1970	Land Raiders	Luisa Rojas	
1970	A Bullet for Pretty Boy	Betty	

=== Television appearances ===
Year	Title	Role	Other notes
1955	Sailor of Fortune	Angelina	
1962	The Cheaters	Anita Faraday	
1962	Armchair Theatre	Ginger	
1963	Love Story	Molly Rosen	
1965	Alfred Hitchcock Presents	Sylvia Sylvester	
1965	The Rogues	Madeline Sorel	
1965	The Man from U.N.C.L.E.	Lisa Donato	
1965	Burke's Law	Adriana Montaigne	
1965	Bob Hope Presents the Chrysler Theatre	Gabrielle	
1966	Run for Your Life	Brigitte Lemaire	
1966	The Smothers Brothers Show	Princess	
1966	Bob Hope Presents the Chrysler Theatre	Ellie Randell	
1966	The Girl from U.N.C.L.E.	Mandy Dean-Tanner	
1966	The Wild Wild West	Dominique	
1968	It Takes a Thief	Michèle	
1968	The Dating Game	Herself	
1969	The Queen and I	Sandy Blair	
1971	V.I.P.-Schaukel	Herself	Last on-screen appearance
