= Sardanapalus =

King of Assyria

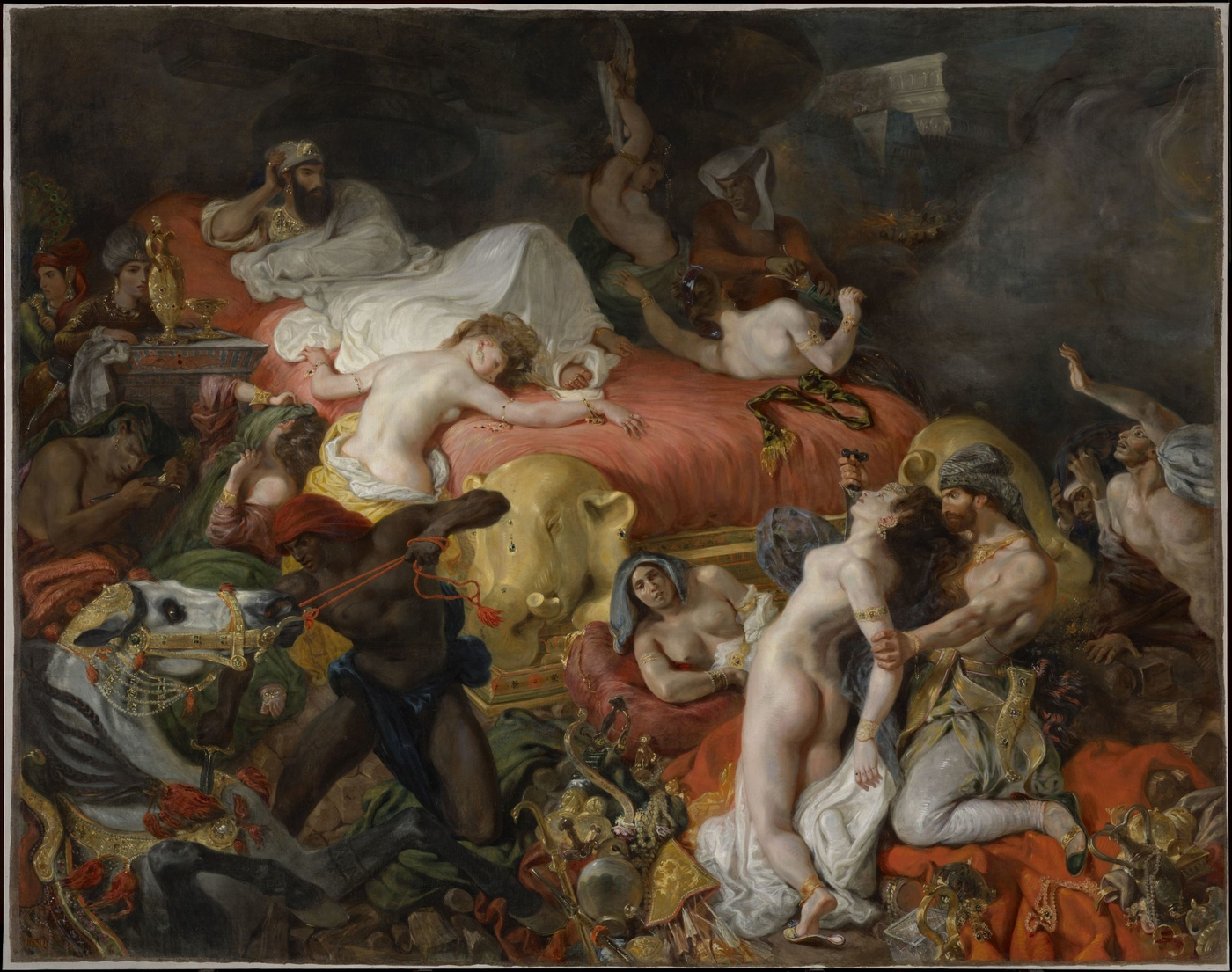
Eugène Delacroix. The Death of Sardanapalus. Oil on canvas. 12 ft 1 in x 16 ft 3 in. Louvre.

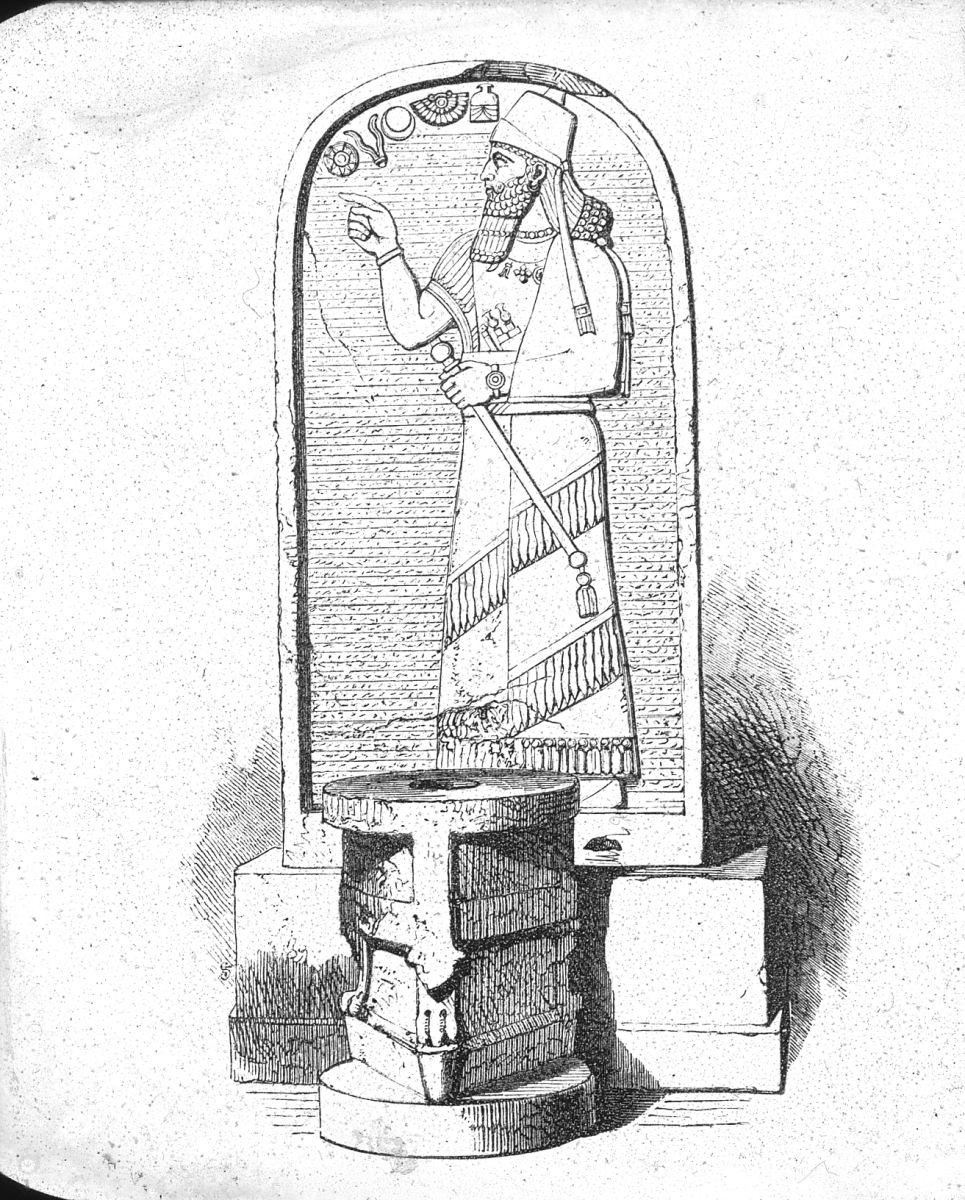
Lantern slide given the title "Sardanapalus" by William Henry Goodyear. Brooklyn Museum Archives, Goodyear Archival Collection

According to the Greek writer Ctesias, Sardanapalus (/ˌsɑːrdəˈnæpələs/ SAR-də-NAP-ə-ləs; Ancient Greek: Σαρδανάπαλος), sometimes spelled Sardanapallus (Σαρδανάπαλλος), was the last king of Assyria, although in fact Aššur-uballiṭ II (612–605 BC) holds that distinction.

Ctesias' book Persica is lost, but we know of its contents by later compilations and from the work of Diodorus (II.27). In this account, Sardanapalus, supposed to have lived in the 7th century BC, is portrayed as a decadent figure who spends his life in self-indulgence and dies in an orgy of destruction. The legendary decadence of Sardanapalus later became a theme in literature and art, especially in the Romantic era.

The name Sardanapalus is probably a corruption of Ashurbanipal (Aššur-bāni-apli > Sar-dan-ápalos), an Assyrian emperor, but Sardanapalus as described by Diodorus bears little relationship with what is known of that king, who in fact was a militarily powerful, highly efficient and scholarly ruler, presiding over the largest empire the world had yet seen.

== Story according to Diodorus ==
Diodorus says that Sardanapalus, son of Anakyndaraxes, exceeded all previous rulers in sloth and luxury. He spent his whole life in self-indulgence. He dressed in women's clothes and wore make-up. He had many concubines, female and male. He wrote his own epitaph, which stated that physical gratification is the only purpose of life. His lifestyle caused dissatisfaction within the Assyrian empire, allowing a conspiracy against him to develop led by "Arbaces". An alliance of Medes, Persians and Babylonians challenged the Assyrians. Sardanapalus stirred himself to action and routed the rebels several times in battle, but failed to crush them. Believing he had defeated the rebels, Sardanapalus returned to his decadent lifestyle, ordering sacrifices and celebrations. But the rebels were reinforced by new troops from Bactria. Sardanapalus's troops were surprised during their partying, and were routed.

Sardanapalus returned to Nineveh to defend his capital, while his army was placed under the command of his brother-in-law, who was soon defeated and killed. Having sent his family to safety, Sardanapalus prepared to hold Nineveh. He managed to withstand a long siege, but eventually heavy rains caused the Tigris to overflow, leading to the collapse of one of the defensive walls. To avoid falling into the hands of his enemies, Sardanapalus had a huge funeral pyre created for himself on which were piled "all his gold, silver and royal apparel". He had his eunuchs and concubines boxed in inside the pyre, burning himself and them to death.

== Historical authenticity ==
There is no king named Sardanapalus attested to in the Assyrian King List. Parts of the story of Sardanapalus seem to be related in some degree to events in the later years of the Assyrian Empire, involving conflict between the Assyrian king Ashurbanipal and his brother Shamash-shum-ukin, who controlled Babylon as a vassal territory, on behalf of his brother. While Sardanapalus has been identified with Ashurbanipal, his alleged death in the flames of his palace is closer to that of his brother Shamash-shum-ukin, who became infused with Babylonian nationalism and formed an alliance of Babylonians, Chaldeans, Elamites, Arabs and Suteans against his master in an attempt to transfer the seat of the vast empire from Nineveh to Babylon.

There is no evidence from Mesopotamia that either Ashurbanipal or Shamash-shum-ukin led hedonistic lifestyles. Both appear to have been strong, disciplined, serious and ambitious rulers, and Ashurbanipal was known to be a literate and scholarly king with an interest in mathematics, astronomy, astrology, history, zoology and botany.

It was Shamash-shum-ukin in Babylon who was besieged and defeated, and his allies crushed, not Ashurbanipal in Nineveh. After the former's defeat in 648 BC, an inscription of Ashurbanipal's records that "they threw down Shamash-shum-ukkin, enemy brother who attacked me, into the raging conflagration".

The actual Fall of Nineveh occurred in 612 BC after Assyria had been greatly weakened by a bitter series of internal civil wars between rival claimants to the throne. Its former subjects took advantage of these events and freed themselves from the Assyrian yoke. Assyria was attacked in 616 BC by allied forces of Medes, Scythians, Babylonians, Chaldeans, Persians, Cimmerians and Elamites. Nineveh was besieged and sacked in 612 BC. Ashurbanipal's son Sin-shar-ishkun (the third of four kings to rule after Ashurbanipal) was then ruling as king of Assyria. He was probably killed defending his city in the sack, though records are fragmentary. Ashur-uballit II succeeded him as the last king of an independent Assyria, ruling from Harran, the last capital of Assyria until 605 BC. Assyria survived as an occupied province and geo-political entity until it was dissolved after the Arab Islamic conquest of Mesopotamia in the 7th century AD. The area is still inhabited by a now Christian and still Eastern Aramaic-speaking indigenous Assyrian minority today.

== Alleged tomb ==
On the eve of the battle of Issus (333 BC), Alexander's biographers say, Alexander the Great was shown what purported to be the tomb of Sardanapalus at Anchialus in Cilicia, with a relief carving of the king clapping his hands and a cuneiform inscription that the locals translated for him as "Sardanapalus, son of Anakyndaraxes, built Anchialus and Tarsus in a single day; stranger, eat, drink and make love, as other human things are not worth this" (signifying the clap of the hands). Several writers, including Cicero, Strabo, Plutarch, Dio Chrysostom and Athenaeus mention different variations of this epitaph.

Historically, there is no record of any Assyrian king dying or being buried in Cilicia.

== In art and literature ==
In the Epitome of Book LXXX of Cassius Dio's Roman History, the Roman emperor Elagabalus, considered by the author supremely dissolute and rakish, is frequently called Sardanapalus.

In the introductory pages of Book I of Aristotle's Nicomachean Ethics, those who (erroneously, according to Aristotle) equate the good life with the life of brute pleasure are likened to Sardanapalus.

The death of Sardanapalus was the subject of a Romantic period painting by the 19th-century French painter Eugène Delacroix, The Death of Sardanapalus, which was itself based on the 1821 play Sardanapalus by Byron, which in turn was based on Diodorus. E. H. Coleridge, in his notes on the works of Byron, states, "It is hardly necessary to remind the modern reader that the Sardanapalus of history is an unverified if not an unverifiable personage... The character which Ctesias depicted or invented, an effeminate debauchee, sunk in luxury and sloth, who at the last was driven to take up arms, and, after a prolonged but ineffectual resistance, avoided capture by suicide, cannot be identified".

In Act 4 of Goethe's Faust II, Faust responds with the exclamation "Sardanapalus!" to Mephistopheles' guess of what it is that Faust strives after. Mephistopheles offers up the life of pleasure as Faust's life's goal.

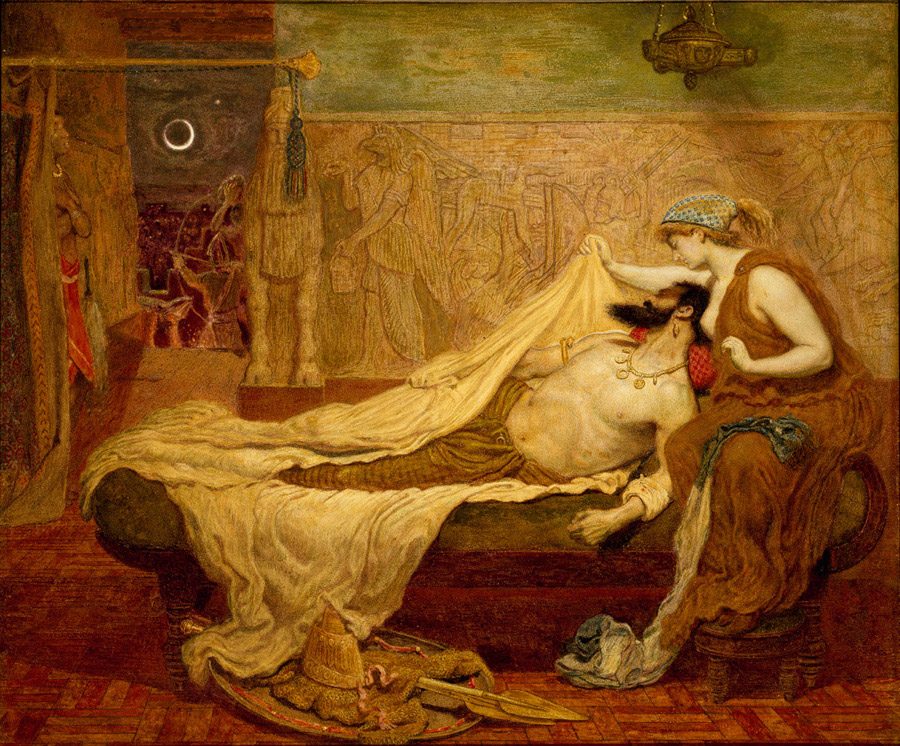
Dream of Sardanapalus, by Ford Madox Brown (1871)

Sardanapalus is a hero in The Fall of Nineveh by Edwin Atherstone. He is portrayed as a criminal who ordered one hundred prisoners of war to be executed and burned his palace with all his concubines inside.

Hector Berlioz, the 19th-century French Romantic composer, wrote a very early cantata, Sardanapale on the subject of the death of Sardanapalus. Written during the July Revolution of 1830, it was his fourth and finally successful attempt in the Prix de Rome competition, run by the Paris Conservatoire. Only a fragment of the score survives.

Franz Liszt began an (incomplete) opera on the subject in 1850, Sardanapalo, Act 1 of which had its world premiere only in 2018, almost a century and a half after the composer's death.

Henry David Thoreau, writes in Walden, "It is the luxurious and dissipated who set the fashions which the herd so diligently follow. The traveller who stops at the best houses, so called, soon discovers this, for the publicans presume him to be a Sardanapalus, and if he resigned himself to their tender mercies he would soon be completely emasculated."

In A Tale of Two Cities, Charles Dickens describes the French Court, and by extension the French Monarchy and upper class: "It had never been a good eye to see with--had long had the mote in it of Lucifer's pride, Sardanapalus's luxury, and a mole's blindness...".

In Dante's Paradiso, XV.107-108, "Sardanapalus had not yet come to show to what use bedrooms can be put." (That is, society had not reached such extremes of decadence.)

In Maxim Gorky's 1902 play, The Lower Depths, Satine calls The Actor "Sardanapalus", when asking him to have a drink, in reference to his decadence.

The legend of Sardanapulus was very loosely adapted as the basis of the 1962 Italian peplum film Le sette folgori di Assur (English title: War Gods of Babylon). The film anachronistically portrays as contemporaries several figures who historically lived hundreds of years apart.

== See also ==
- Dionysus Sardanapalus, a sculpture of Dionysus erroneously named after the king
- Sardis
- Shardana
