= Arbaces (satrap) =

Arbaces was a commander in the army of Artaxerxes II of Persia, which fought against his brother Cyrus the Younger, in 401 BC. He was satrap of Media.
