= Emil Haraszti =

Emil Haraszti (1885 - 1958) was a Hungarian born French music critic and author. He was a director of the National Conservatory of Music in Budapest and was a scholar at the University of Budapest but lived much of his life in France and publishing in French.

In 1910, at the age of 25, he published a paper on Polish composer Frédéric Chopin, entitled, Chopin és George Sand. Later, in 1956, he would publish another work on Chopin, L'élément latin dans l'oeuvre de Chopin.

In the summer of 1936, Haraszti published a two-part essay on Franz Liszt, entitled Liszt á Paris in the publication La Revue Musicale. In 1937 he published Deux Franciscians: Adam et Franz Liszt and in December of that year published La Probleme Liszt. The essay, which is a deep exploration of the musicality of Liszt, established Haraszti as one of the foremost Liszt scholars of his generation.

Haraszti famously criticized composer Béla Bartók for lacking interest in Hungarian music, describing him as "becoming an apostle of Czech, Romanian and Slovak music". He authored a book on Bartók, Béla Bartók: His Life and Works, published in 1938. He also authored a book which has been published in French, La Musique hongroise, meaning, "Hungarian Music".
