= La Belle au bois dormant (Carafa) =

1825 opera in three acts by Michele Carafa

La Belle au bois dormant (French: [la bɛl‿o bwa dɔʁmɑ̃]; lit. 'The Sleeping Beauty in the Woods') is an opera in three acts by Michele Carafa to a French libretto by Eugène de Planard after the tale by Charles Perrault.

It was first performed on 2 March 1825 at the Salle Le Peletier of Paris Opera. The famous tenor Adolphe Nourrit created the role of the Prince. Choreography was by Pierre Gardel, and set design by Pierre-Luc-Charles Cicéri.

== Main roles ==
- Aurora, soprano
- The Queen, soprano
- The Prince, tenor
- Carabosse, baritone
- King Florestan, baritone
