= Arbaces =

Assyrian general (fl. 830 BC)

According to Ctesias, Arbaces was one of the generals of Sardanapalus, king of Assyria and founder of the Median Empire about 830 BC.

Opinion on him is divided. Some state that Ctesias's whole history of the Assyrian and Median empires is absolutely fabulous; his Arbaces and his successors are not historical personages. Mahmoud Omidsalar suggests that "the very fact that all but one of the kings in Ctesias's list are not historical implies that these kings were legendary rulers who belonged to the ancient Iranian lore, and records of their exploits existed in some written form in the fifth century BC"

Others cite the inscriptions of Sargon II of Assyria, from which it is known that one Arbaku of Arnashia was one of forty-five chiefs of Median districts who paid tribute to Sargon in 713 BC. He was a satrap, who conspired against Sardanapalus, and founded the empire of Media on the ruins of the Assyrian kingdom.
