= Khosr River =

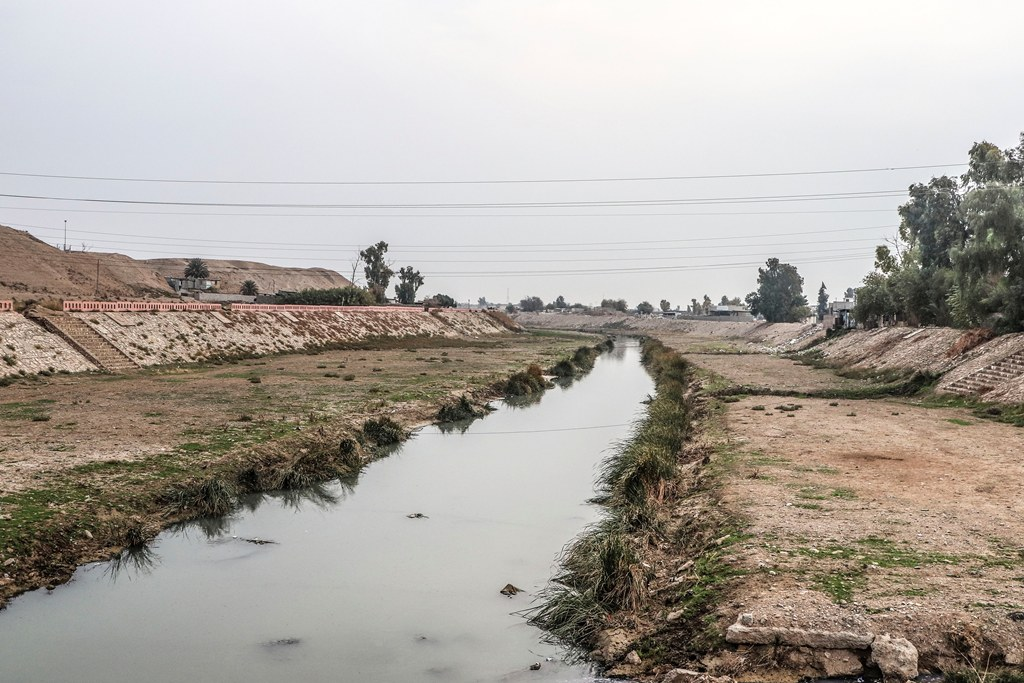
- Khosr River running through Nineveh

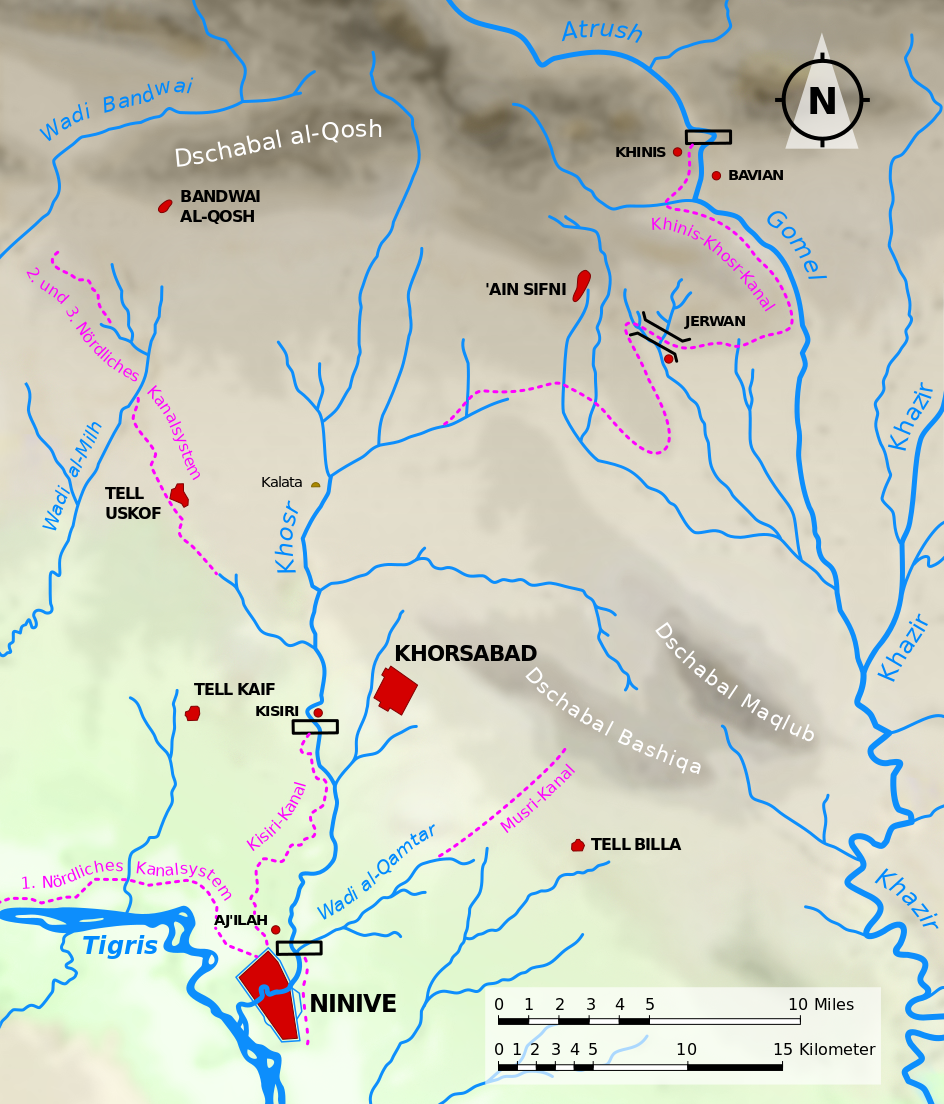
- Topography of the course of the Khosr River and location of ancient cities as well as Sennacherib's waterworks including dams and canals

Location
- Country: Iraq
- Region: Nineveh Governorate

Physical characteristics
- Source
  - coordinates: 36°36′13″N 43°11′47″E
- Mouth: Tigris
  - location: Mosul
  - coordinates: 36°20′43″N 43°8′27″E

The Khosr River (Arabic: نهر الخوصر, Nahr al-Khosr) is a 47-kilometre (29 mi) long intermittent river located in the Nineveh Governorate in Iraq. It is a tributary of the Tigris, joining its left bank.

== History ==
During the reign of Sennacherib, walls were built along the banks of the Khosr River to prevent it from flooding. Moreover, to secure the water supply for his capial Nineveh, Sennacherib carried out hydraulic engineering projects and connected the Khosr River with the Jerwan Aqueduct.

== Course ==
The Khosr River originates in the al-Qosh mountains and flows approximately from north to south passing through the Nineveh Plains and the archaeological sites of Dur-Sharrukin and Niniveh. It finally joins the Tigris in Mosul. The river is fed by rainwater in Winter.

== See also ==
- Nineveh
- Khinnis Reliefs
