= Nineveh =

Ancient Assyrian city

- ܢܝܼܢܘܹܐ
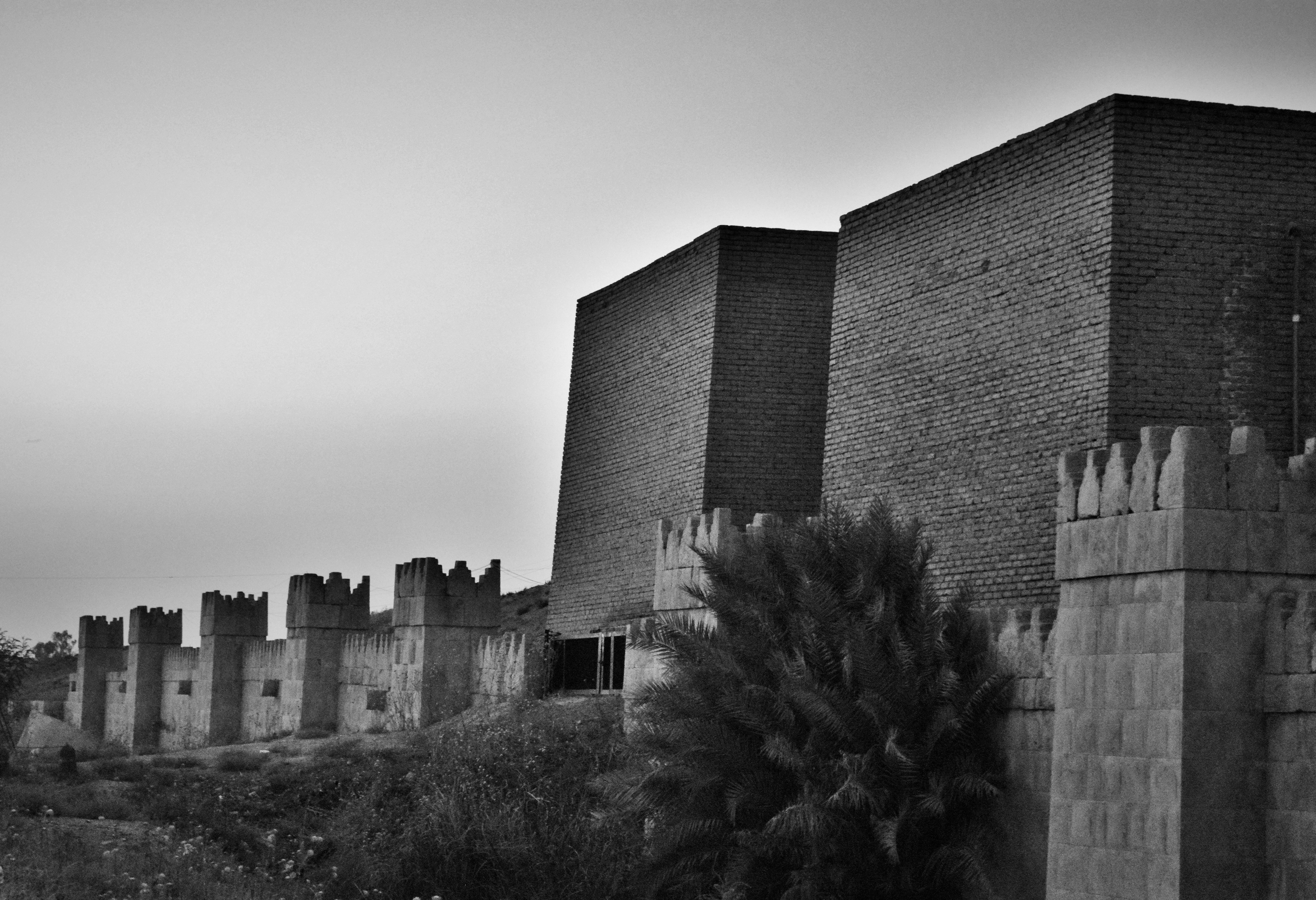
- The reconstructed Mashki Gate of Nineveh (since destroyed by the Islamic State)

- Location within Iraq Location within Near East
- 36°21′34″N 43°09′10″E
- Type: Settlement
- Location: Mosul, Nineveh Governorate, Iraq
- Region: Mesopotamia

History
- Built: c. 3000 BC
- Abandoned: 612 BC
- Event: Fall of Nineveh

Site notes
- Area: 7.5 km^{2} (2.9 sq mi)
- Excavation dates: 1845–1852, 1873–1874, 1885–1891, 1904–1905, 1929–1932, 1951–1958, 1967–1971, 1987–1990, 2019–2026
- Archaeologists: Austen Henry Layard, Hormuzd Rassam, Leonard William King, Reginald Campbell Thompson, Mohammed Ali Mustafa, David Stronach

Nineveh (Note: /ˈnɪnɪvə/ NIN-iv-ə: Akkadian: 𒌷𒉌𒉡𒀀, ^{URU}NI.NU.A, Ninua; Biblical Hebrew: נִינְוֵה, Nīnəwē; Arabic: نِينَوَىٰ, Nīnawā; Syriac: ܢܝܼܢܘܹܐ, Nīnwē) was an ancient Near Eastern city of Upper Mesopotamia, located in the modern-day city of Mosul in northern Iraq. It is located on the eastern bank of the Tigris River and was the capital and largest city of the Neo-Assyrian Empire, and potentially the wealthiest city in the ancient world. Today, it is a common name for the half of Mosul that lies on the eastern bank of the Tigris, and the country's Nineveh Governorate takes its name from it.

It was the largest city in the world for approximately fifty years until the year 612 BC when, after a bitter period of civil war in Assyria, it was sacked by a coalition of its former subject peoples including the Babylonians, Medes, and Scythians. The city was never again a political or administrative centre, but by Late Antiquity it was the seat of a bishop of the Church of the East. It declined relative to Mosul during the Middle Ages and was mostly abandoned by the 14th century AD after the massacres and dispersal of Assyrian Christians by Timur.

Its ruins lie across the river from the historical city center of Mosul. The two main tells, or mound-ruins, within the walls are Tell Kuyunjiq and Tell Nabī Yūnus, site of a shrine to Jonah. According to the Hebrew Bible and the Quran, Jonah was a prophet who preached to Nineveh. Large numbers of Assyrian sculptures and other artifacts have been excavated from the ruins of Nineveh, and are now located in museums around the world.

The location of Nineveh was known, to some, continuously through the Middle Ages. Benjamin of Tudela visited it in 1170; Petachiah of Regensburg soon after.

== Name ==
The English placename Nineveh comes from the Latin Nīnevē and the Koine Greek Nineuḗ (Νινευή) under influence of the Biblical Hebrew Nīnəweh (נִינְוֶה), from the Akkadian Ninua (var. Ninâ) or Ninuwā. The city was also known as Ninuwa in Mari; Ninawa in Aramaic; Ninwe (ܢܝܢܘܐ) in Syriac; and Ninawa (نينوى) in Arabic.

Nabī Yūnus is the Arabic for "Prophet Jonah". Kuyunjiq was, according to Layard, a Turkish name; Layard used the form kouyunjik, the diminutive of koyun ("sheep") in Turkish. Kuyunjiq was also known as Armousheeah by the Arabs and it is thought to have some connection with the Qara Qoyunlu dynasty.

== Geography ==
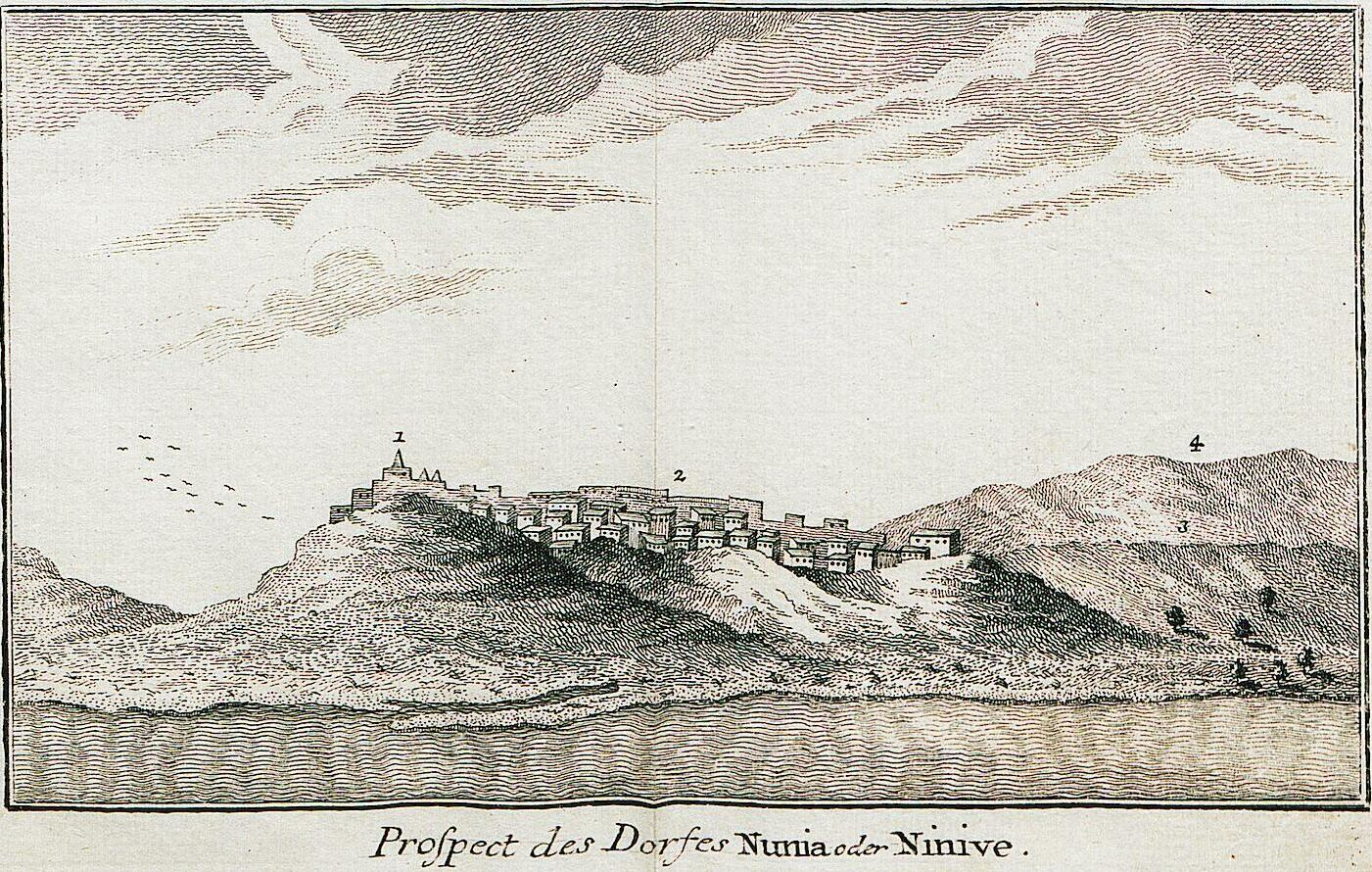
View of the village of "Nunia" or "Ninive", published by Carsten Niebuhr in 1778

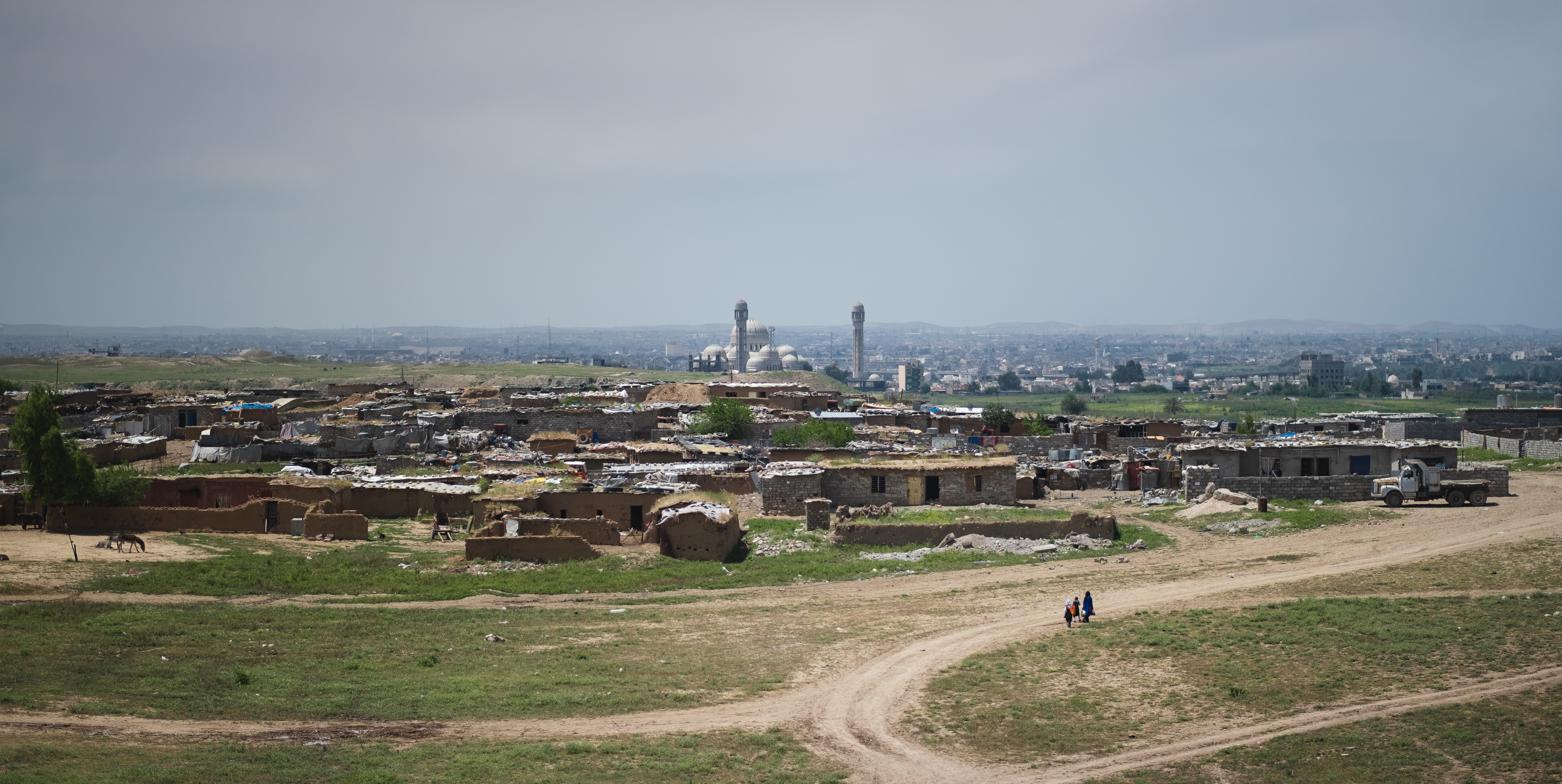
Village in Nineveh in 2019

The remains of ancient Nineveh, the areas of Kuyunjiq and Nabī Yūnus with their mounds, are located on a level part of the plain at the junction of the Tigris and the Khosr Rivers within an area of 750 hectares (1,900 acres) circumscribed by a 12-kilometre (7.5 mi) fortification wall. This whole extensive space is now one immense area of ruins, roughly a third of these overlaid by the Nebi Yunus suburbs of the city of eastern Mosul.

The site of ancient Nineveh is bisected by the Khosr river. North of the Khosr, the site is called Kuyunjiq, including the acropolis of Tell Kuyunjiq; the illegal village of Rahmaniye lay in eastern Kuyunjiq. South of the Khosr, the urbanized area is called Nebi Yunus (also Ghazliya, Jezayr, Jammasa), including Tell Nebi Yunus, where are the mosque of the Prophet Jonah, and a palace of Esarhaddon/Ashurbanipal below it. South of the street Al-'Asady (made by Daesh by destroying swaths of the city walls) the area is called Junub Ninawah or Shara Pepsi.

== History ==
=== Neolithic ===
Nineveh itself was founded as early as 6000 BC during the late Neolithic period. Deep sounding at Nineveh uncovered soil layers that have been dated to early in the era of the Hassuna archaeological culture. The development and culture of Nineveh paralleled Tepe Gawra and Tell Arpachiyah a few kilometers to the northeast. Nineveh was a typical farming village in the Halaf Period.

=== Chalcolithic ===
==== Ubaid period ====
In 5000 BC, Nineveh transitioned from a Halaf village to an Ubaid village. During the Late Chalcolithic period Nineveh was one of the few Ubaid villages in Upper Mesopotamia which became a proto-city. Others include Ugarit, Brak, Hamoukar, Arbela, Alep, and regionally Susa, Eridu, Nippur. During the period between 4500 and 4000 BC it grew to 40 hectares in size.

The greater Nineveh area is notable in the diffusion of metal technology across the near east as the first location outside of Anatolia to smelt copper. Tell Arpachiyah has the oldest copper smelting remains, and Tepe Gawra has the oldest metal work. The copper came from the mines at Ergani.

==== Uruk period ====
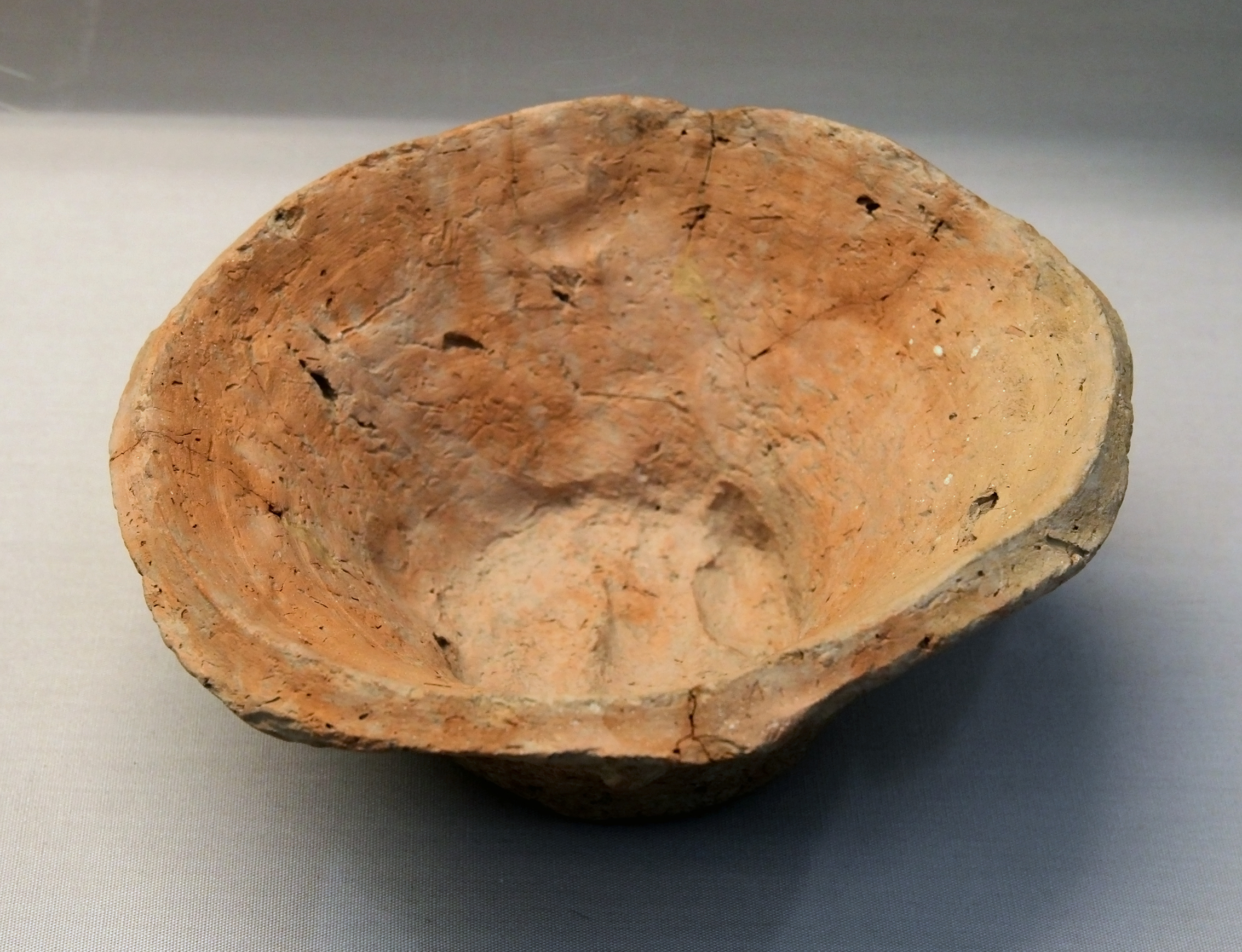
Beveled rim bowl. Clay, from Nineveh, Late Uruk Period, 3300-3100 BC. British Museum

Nineveh IV became a trade colony of Uruk during the Uruk Expansion because of its location as the highest navigable point on the Tigris. It was contemporary with, and had a similar function to, Habuba Kabira on the Euphrates. Finds included beveled rim bowls.

=== Early Bronze Age ===
==== Ninevite 5 period ====
Following the Late Uruk period, the regional influence of Nineveh became particularly pronounced. This period is known as Ninevite 5, or Ninevite V (3000/2900–2600/2500 BC) and is defined primarily by the characteristic pottery that is found widely throughout Upper Mesopotamia. Also, for the Upper Mesopotamian region, the Early Jezirah chronology has been developed by archaeologists. According to this regional chronology, 'Ninevite 5' is equivalent to the Early Jezirah I–II period.

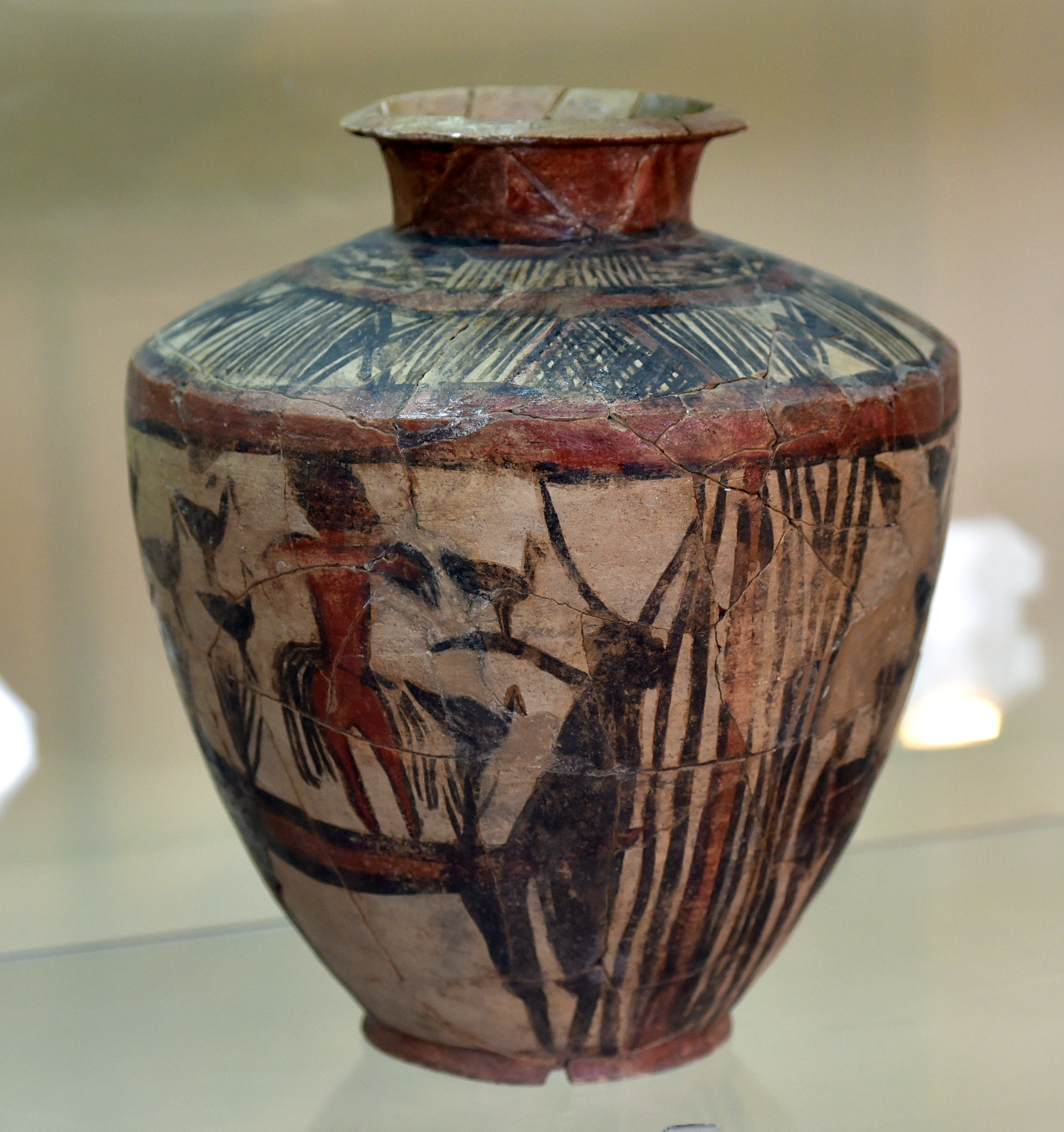
Polychrome painted jar, geometric designs and animals, the so-called "Scarlet Ware". From Tell Abu Qasim at Hamrin Basin, Iraq. 2800–2600 BCE. Iraq Museum

Ninevite 5 pottery is roughly contemporary to the Early Transcaucasian culture ware, and the Jemdet Nasr period ware. Iraqi Scarlet Ware culture also belongs to this period; this colourful painted pottery is somewhat similar to Jemdet Nasr ware. Scarlet Ware was first documented in the Diyala River basin in Iraq. Later, it was also found in the nearby Hamrin Basin, and in Luristan. It is also contemporary with the Proto-Elamite period in Susa.

Ninevite 5 can be subdivided into the Early Ninevite 5 (3000-2750 BC) characterized by painted pottery and Late Ninevite 5 (2750-2500 BC) with incised pottery. In southern Mesopotamia, the former is contemporary with ED I-II, while the latter mirrors ED II-IIIA.

Styles related to Nineveh 5

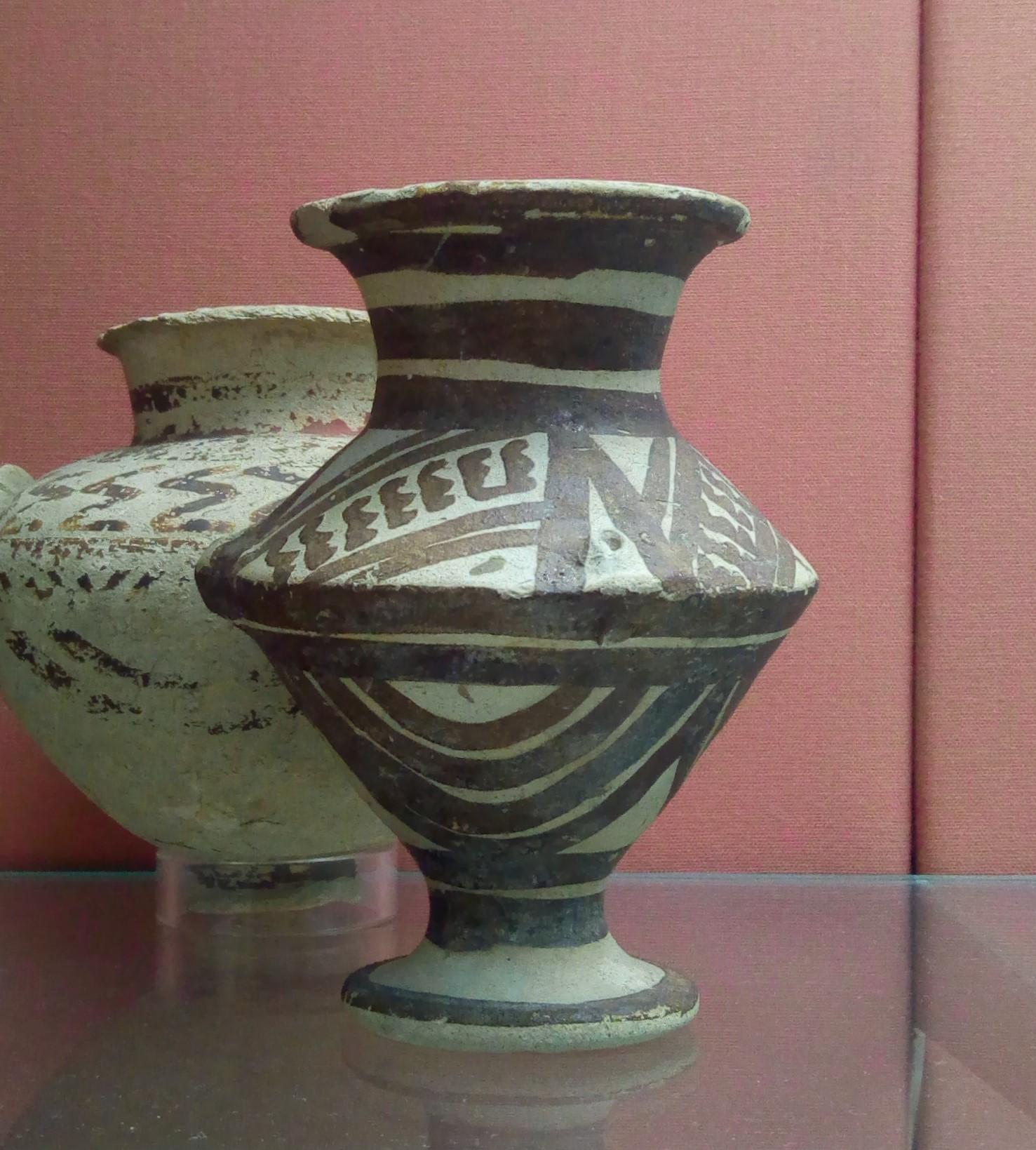
Painted jar – Ninevite 5

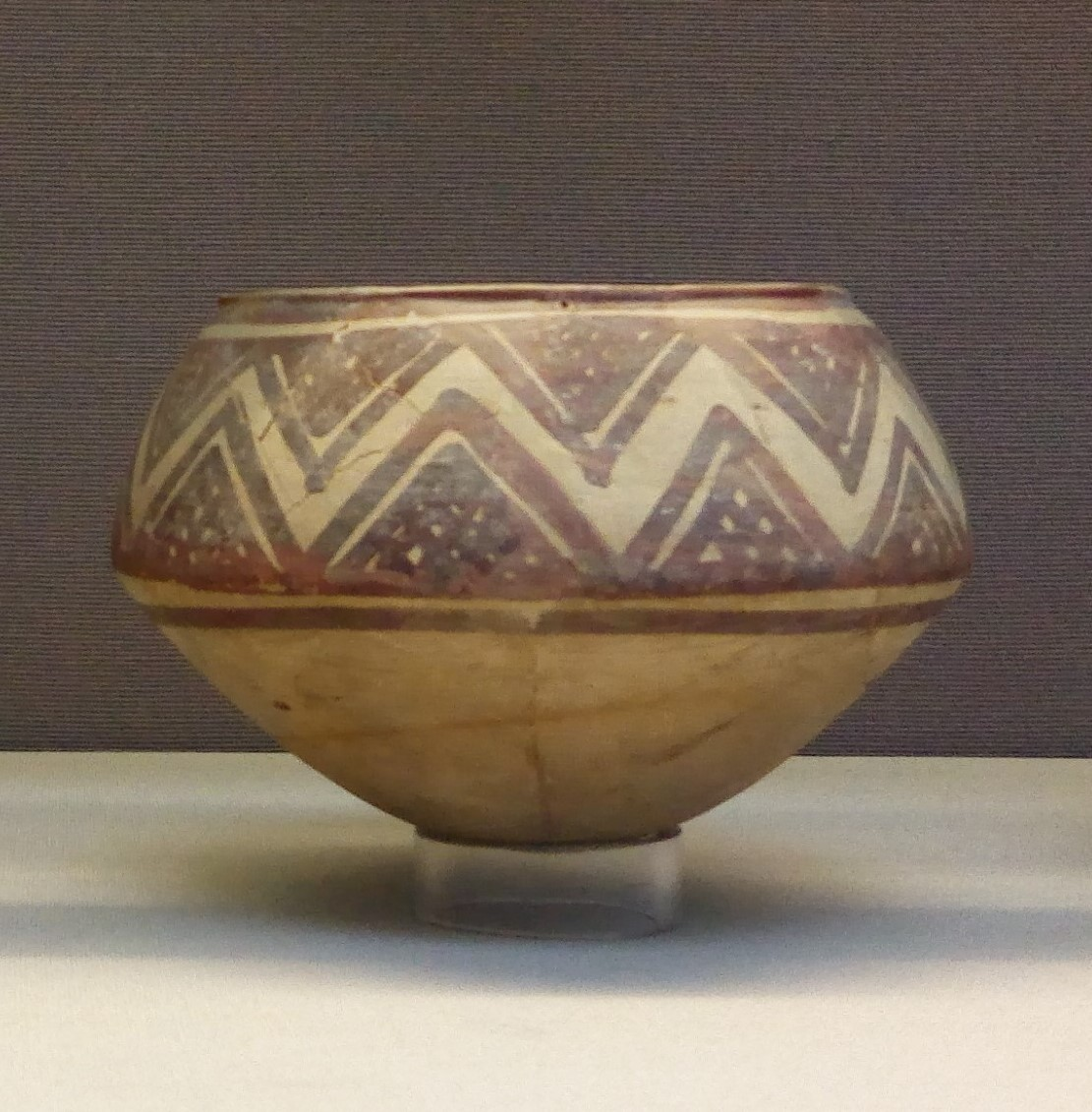
Painted bowl – Uruk-Nineveh 5 transition

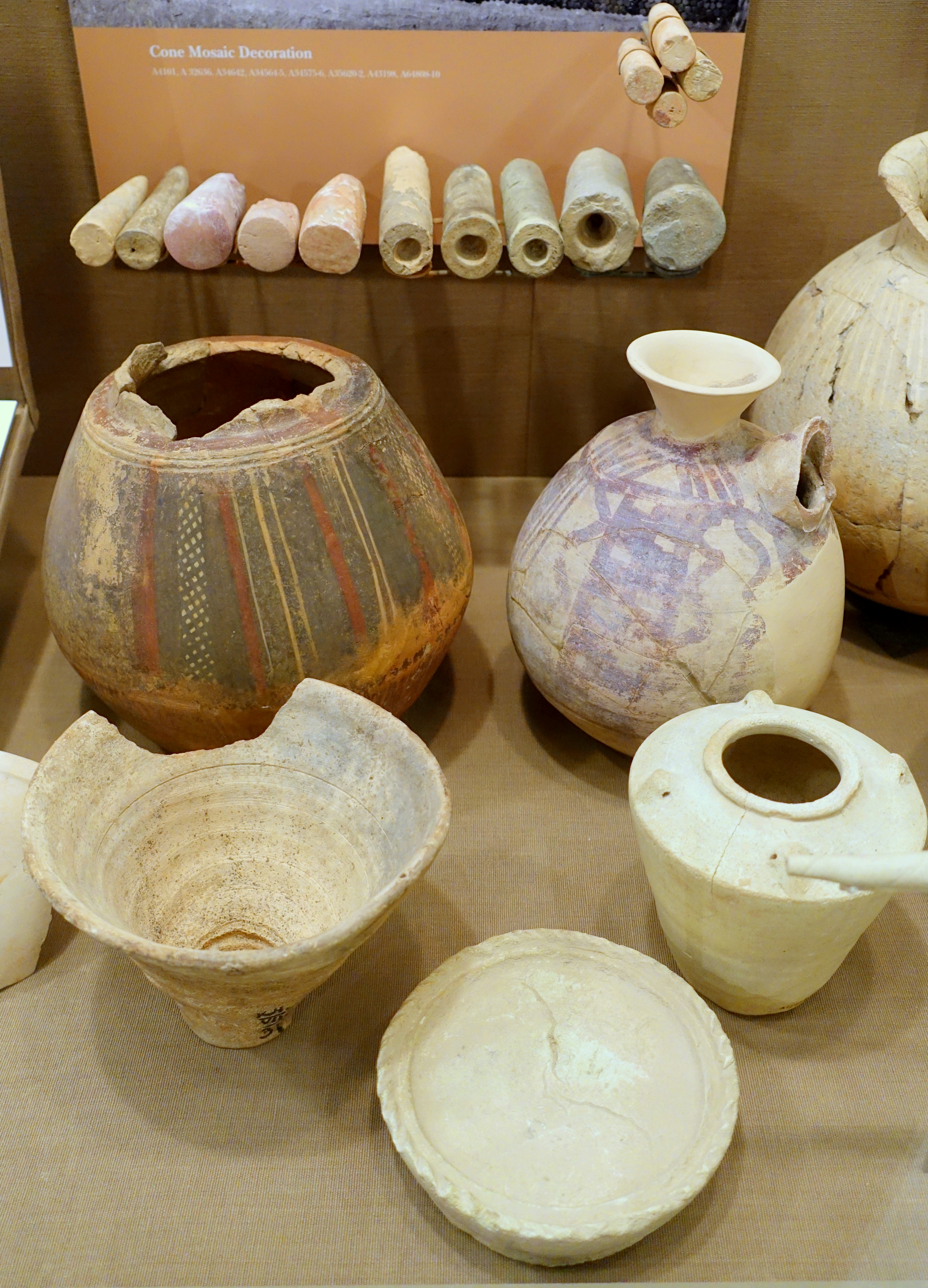
Jemdet Nasr ware

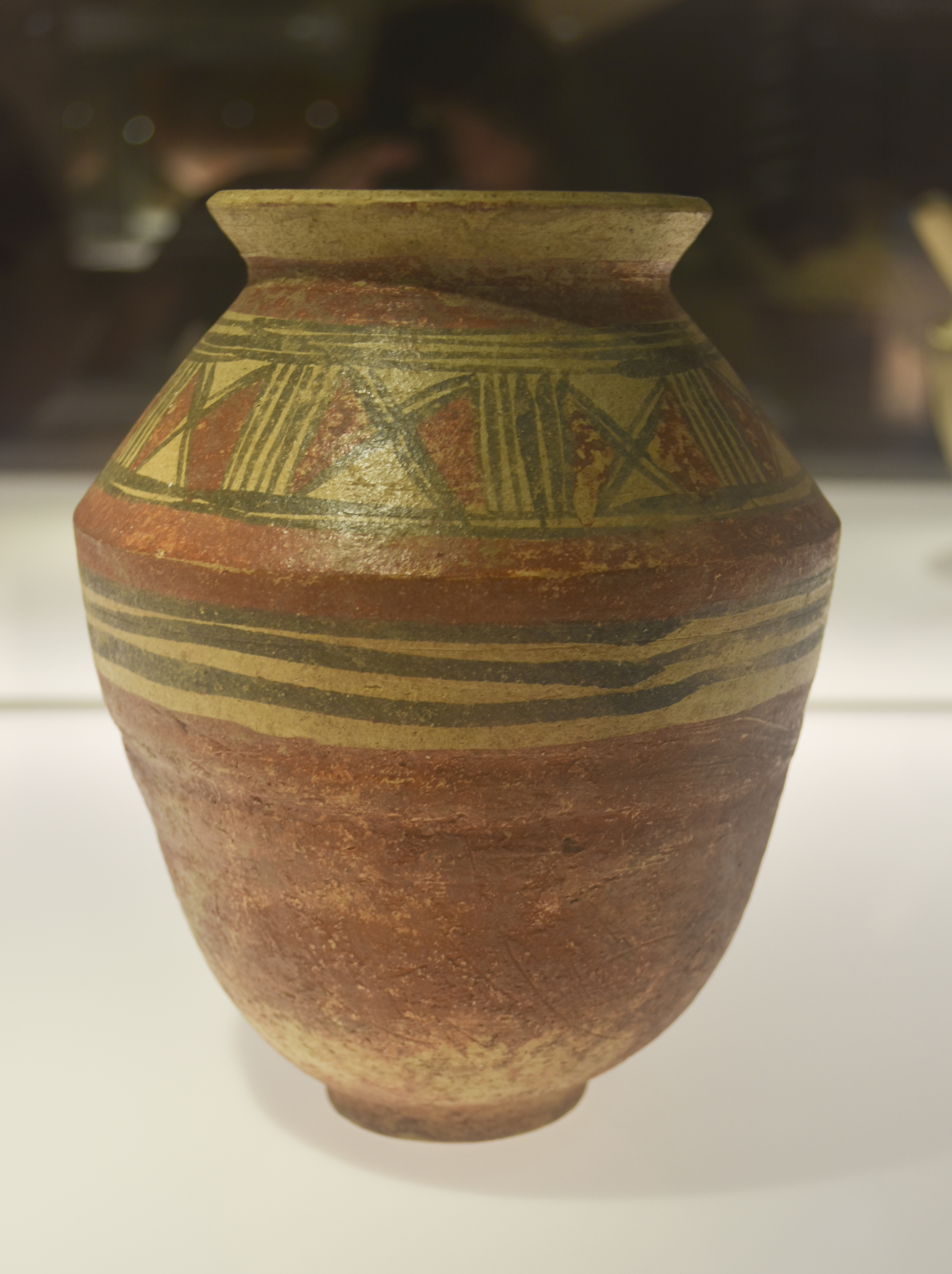
Proto-Elamite ware 3100 BC

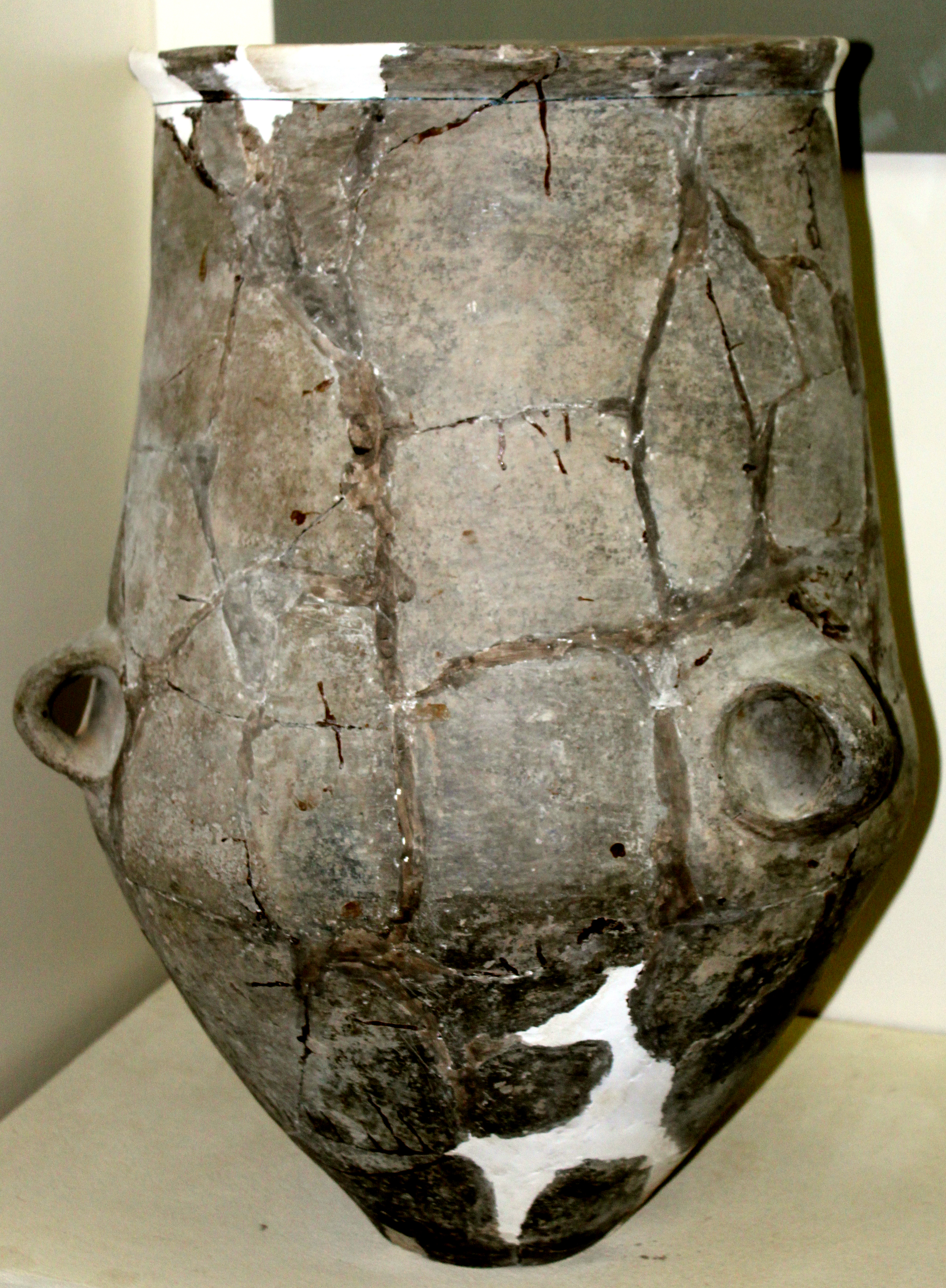
Pottery jar, Tepeyatagi, Khudat district, Kura-Araxtes culture

==== Akkadian period ====
In the late 3rd millennium BC Nineveh was part of the Akkadian Empire. While the site was occupied in that period, there was minimal official Akkadian presence there—unlike at Assur which had a much more notable presence. An Akkadian period bronze statue head found at Nineveh was later determined to be a 7th century addition.

=== Middle Bronze ===
In the early 2nd millennium BC Nineveh became part of the Kingdom of Upper Mesopotamia during the reign of Shamshi-Adad I (c. 1809–1775 BC), Amorite ruler of Ekallatum. It became a center of worship of Ishtar.

=== Late Bronze ===
==== Mitanni period ====
The goddess's statue was sent to Pharaoh Amenhotep III of Egypt in the 14th century BC, by orders of the king Tushratta of Mitanni. Nineveh became one of Mitanni's vassals for half a century until the early 14th century BC.

==== Middle Assyrian period ====
The Assyrian king Ashur-uballit I reclaimed it in 1365 BC while overthrowing the Mitanni Empire and creating the Middle Assyrian Empire (1365–1050 BC).

There is a large body of evidence to show that Assyrian monarchs built extensively in Nineveh during the late 3rd and 2nd millennia BC; it appears to have been originally an "Assyrian provincial town". Later monarchs whose inscriptions have appeared on the high city include the Middle Assyrian Empire kings Shalmaneser I (1274–1245 BC) and Tiglath-Pileser I (1114–1076 BC), both of whom were active builders in Assur (Ashur).

=== Iron Age ===
==== Neo-Assyrian period ====
During the Neo-Assyrian Empire, particularly from the time of Ashurnasirpal II (ruled 883–859 BC) onward, there was considerable architectural expansion. Successive monarchs such as Tiglath-pileser III, Sargon II, Sennacherib, Esarhaddon, and Ashurbanipal maintained and founded new palaces, as well as temples to Sîn, Ashur, Nergal, Shamash, Ninurta, Ishtar, Tammuz, Nisroch and Nabu.

==== Sennacherib's development of Nineveh ====
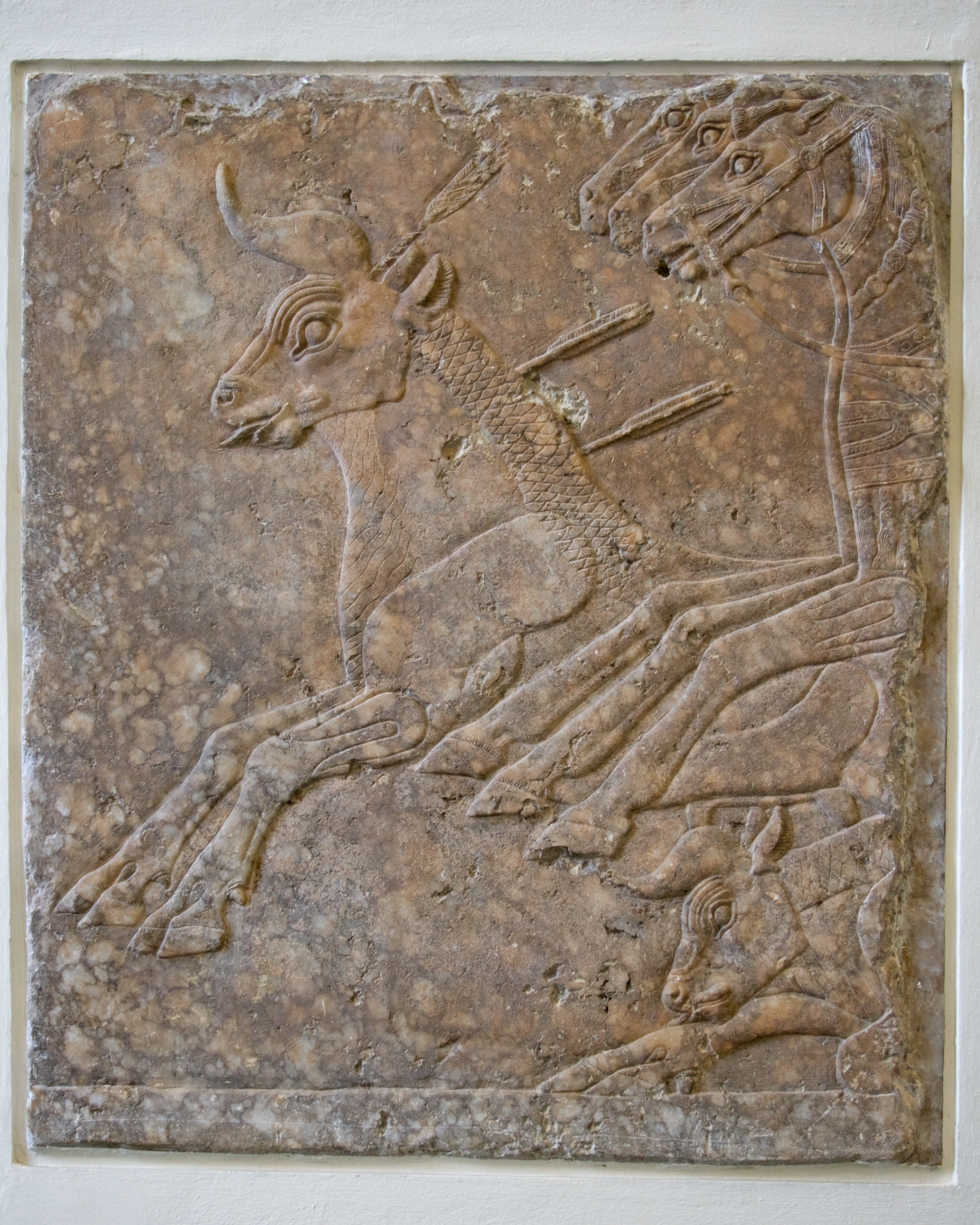
Refined low-relief section of a bull-hunt frieze from Nineveh, alabaster, c. 695 BC (Pergamon Museum, Berlin)

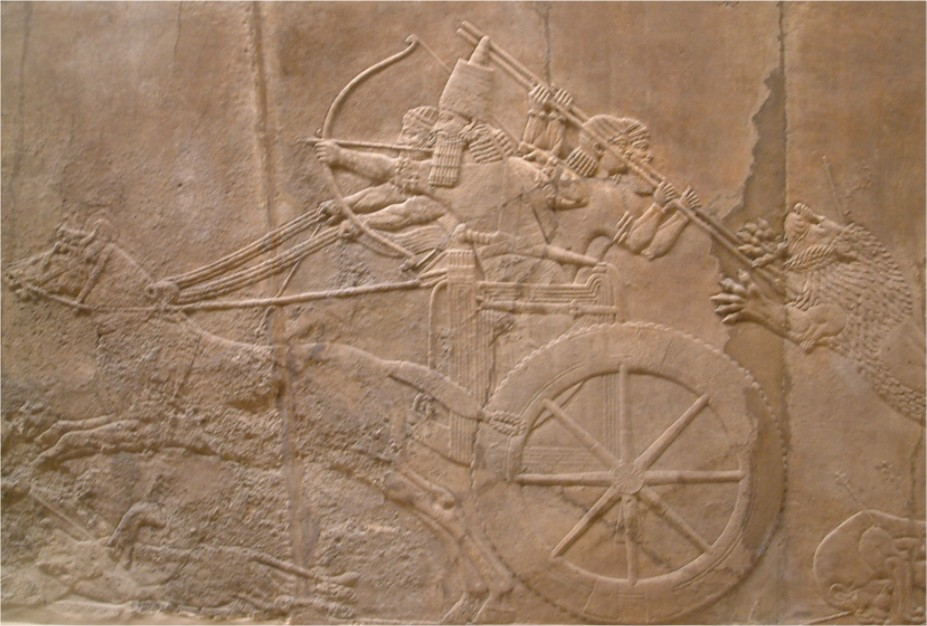
Relief of Ashurbanipal hunting a Mesopotamian lion, from the Northern Palace in Nineveh, as seen at the British Museum

It was Sennacherib who made Nineveh a truly influential city (c. 700 BC), as he laid out new streets and squares, and built within it the South West Palace, or "palace without a rival", the plan of which has been mostly recovered and has overall dimensions of about 503 by 242 metres (1,650 ft × 794 ft). It had at least 80 rooms, many of which were lined with sculpture. A large number of cuneiform tablets were found in the palace. The solid foundation was made out of limestone blocks and mud bricks; it was 22 metres (72 ft) tall. In total, the foundation is made of roughly 2,680,000 cubic metres (3,505,308 yd^{3}) of brick (approximately 160 million bricks). The walls on top, made out of mud brick, were an additional 20 metres (66 ft) tall.

Some of the principal doorways were flanked by colossal stone lamassu door figures weighing up to 30,000 kilograms (30 t); these were winged Mesopotamian lions or bulls, with human heads. These were transported 50 kilometres (31 mi) from quarries at Balatai, and they had to be lifted up 20 metres (66 ft) once they arrived at the site, presumably by a ramp. There are also 3,000 metres (9,843 ft) of stone Assyrian palace reliefs, that include pictorial records documenting every construction step including carving the statues and transporting them on a barge. One picture shows 44 men towing a colossal statue. The carving shows three men directing the operation while standing on the Colossus. Once the statues arrived at their destination, the final carving was done. Most of the statues weigh between 9,000 and 27,000 kilograms (19,842 and 59,525 lb).

The stone carvings in the walls include many battle scenes, impalings and scenes showing Sennacherib's men parading the spoils of war before him. The inscriptions boasted of his conquests: he wrote of Babylon: "Its inhabitants, young and old, I did not spare, and with their corpses I filled the streets of the city." A full and characteristic set shows the campaign leading up to the siege of Lachish in 701 BC; it is the "finest" from the reign of Sennacherib, and now in the British Museum. He later wrote about a battle in Lachish: "And Hezekiah of Judah who had not submitted to my yoke ... him I shut up in Jerusalem his royal city like a caged bird. Earthworks I threw up against him, and anyone coming out of his city gate I made pay for his crime. His cities which I had plundered I had cut off from his land."

At this time, Nineveh comprised about 7 square kilometres (1,730 acres) of land, and fifteen great gates penetrated its walls. An elaborate system of eighteen canals brought water from the hills to Nineveh, and several sections of a magnificently constructed aqueduct erected by Sennacherib were discovered at Jerwan, about 65 kilometres (40 mi) distant. The enclosed area had more than 100,000 inhabitants (maybe closer to 150,000), about twice as many as Babylon at the time, placing it among the largest settlements worldwide.

Some scholars such as Stephanie Dalley at Oxford believe that the garden Sennacherib built next to his palace, with its associated irrigation works, was the original Hanging Gardens of Babylon; Dalley's argument is based on a disputation of the traditional placement of the Hanging Gardens attributed to Berossus, together with a combination of literary and archaeological evidence.

==== After Ashurbanipal ====
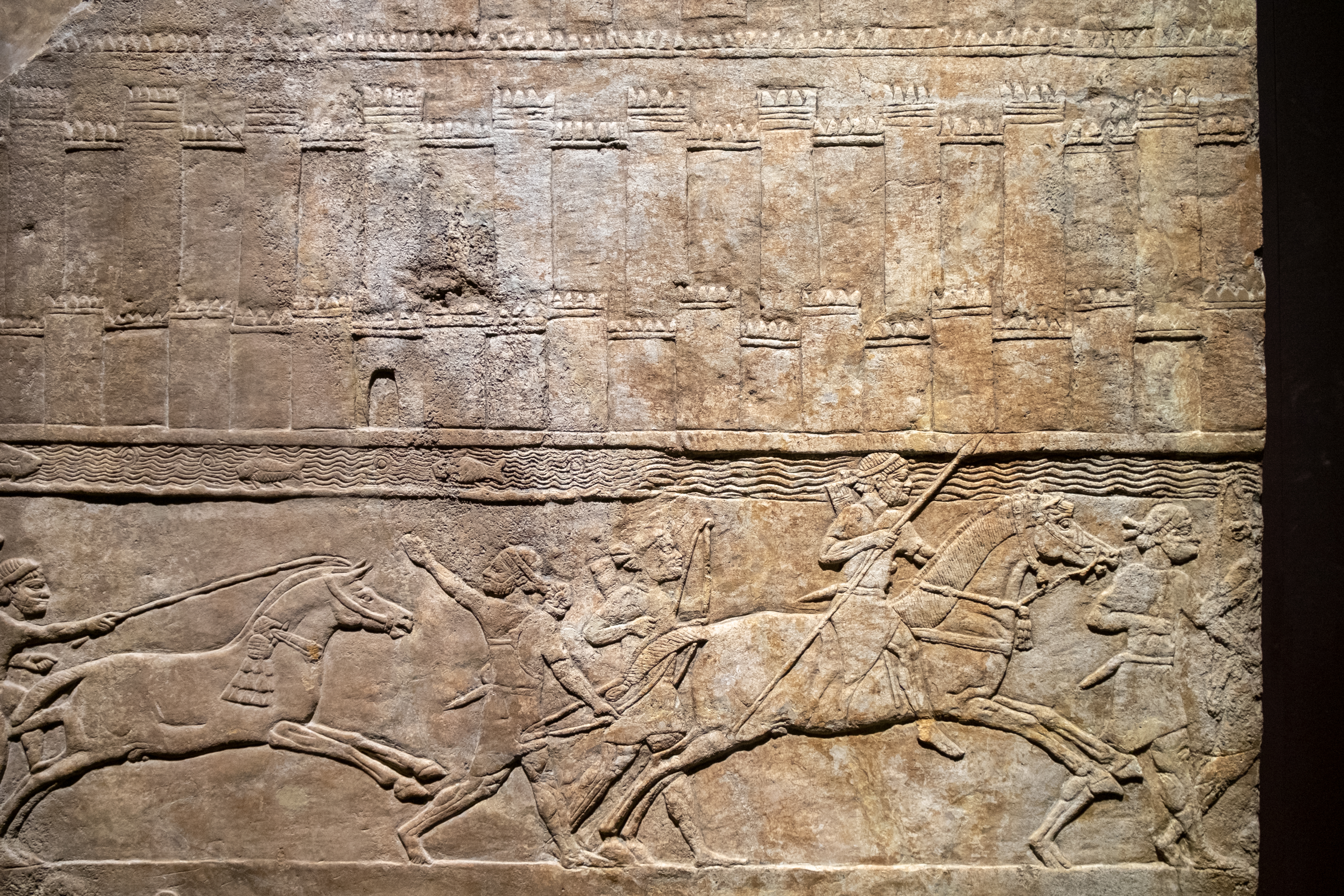
The walls of Nineveh at the time of Ashurbanipal. 645–640 BC. British Museum BM 124938.

The greatness of Nineveh was short-lived. In around 627 BC, after the death of its last great king Ashurbanipal, the Neo-Assyrian Empire began to unravel through a series of bitter civil wars between rival claimants for the throne, and in 616 BC Assyria was attacked by its own former vassals, the Chaldeans, Babylonians, Medes, and Scythians. In about 616 BC Kalhu was sacked, the allied forces eventually reached Nineveh, besieging and sacking the city in 612 BC, following bitter house-to-house fighting, after which it was razed. Most of the people in the city who could not escape to the last Assyrian strongholds in the north and west were either massacred or deported out of the city and into the countryside where they founded new settlements. Many unburied skeletons were found by the archaeologists at the site. The Assyrian Empire then came to an end by 605 BC, the Medes and Babylonians dividing its colonies between themselves.

It is not clear whether Nineveh came under the rule of the Medes or the Neo-Babylonian Empire in 612. The Babylonian Chronicles concerning the Fall of Nineveh record that Nineveh was "turned into mounds and heaps", but this is literary hyperbole. The complete destruction of Nineveh has traditionally been seen as confirmed by the Hebrew Book of Zephaniah and the Greek Retreat of the Ten Thousand of Xenophon (d. 354 BC). There are no later cuneiform tablets in Akkadian from Nineveh. Although devastated in 612 BC, the city was not completely abandoned. Yet, to the Greek historians Ctesias and Herodotus (c. 400 BC), Nineveh was a thing of the past; and when Xenophon passed the place in the 4th century BC he described it as abandoned.

=== Persian period ===
The earliest piece of written evidence for the persistence of Nineveh as a settlement is possibly the Cyrus Cylinder of 539/538 BC, but the reading of this is disputed. If correctly read as Nineveh, it indicates that Cyrus the Great restored the temple of Ishtar at Nineveh and probably encouraged resettlement. A number of cuneiform Elamite tablets have been found at Nineveh. They probably date from the time of the revival of Elam in the century following the collapse of Assyria.

Archaeologically, there is evidence of repairs at the temple of Nabu after 612 BC and for the continued use of Sennacherib's palace. There is evidence of syncretic Hellenistic cults. A statue of Hermes has been found and a Greek inscription attached to a shrine of the Sebitti. A statue of Herakles Epitrapezios dated to the 2nd century AD has also been found.

=== Classical period ===
The city was actively resettled under the Seleucid Empire. There is evidence of more changes in Sennacherib's palace under the Parthian Empire. The Parthians also established a municipal mint at Nineveh coining in bronze. According to Tacitus, in AD 50 Meherdates, a claimant to the Parthian throne with Roman support, took Nineveh.

=== Late Antiquity ===
By Late Antiquity, Nineveh was restricted to the east bank of the Tigris and the west bank was uninhabited. Under the Sasanian Empire, Nineveh was not an administrative centre. By the 2nd century AD there were Christians present and by 554 it was a bishopric of the Church of the East. King Khosrow II (591–628) built a fortress on the west bank, and two Christian monasteries were constructed around 570 and 595. This growing settlement was not called Mosul until after the Arab conquests. It may have been called Hesnā ʿEbrāyē (Jews' Fort).

In 627, the city was the site of the Battle of Nineveh between the Eastern Roman Empire and the Sasanians. In 641, it was conquered by the Arabs, who built a mosque on the west bank and turned it into an administrative centre. Under the Umayyad dynasty, Mosul eclipsed Nineveh, which was reduced to a Christian suburb with limited new construction. By the 13th century, Nineveh was mostly ruins and was subsequently absorbed into Mosul. A church was converted into a Muslim shrine to the prophet Jonah, which continued to attract pilgrims until its destruction by ISIL in 2014. In late Ottoman times, the ashlar masonry of the North Palace of Ashurbanipal was quarried to make for the pilons of the Old Bridge over the Tigris. The modern city of Mosul is occasionally referred to as Nineveh, such as during the operation to retake Mosul in 2016–17.

== Biblical Nineveh ==
In the Hebrew Bible, Nineveh is first mentioned in Genesis 10:11: "Ashur left that land, and built Nineveh". Some modern English translations interpret "Ashur" in the Hebrew of this verse as the country "Assyria" rather than a person, thus making Nimrod, rather than Ashur, the founder of Nineveh. The discovery of the fifteen Jubilees texts found amongst the Dead Sea Scrolls has since shown that, according to the Jewish sects of Qumran, Genesis 10:11 affirms the apportionment of Nineveh to Ashur.

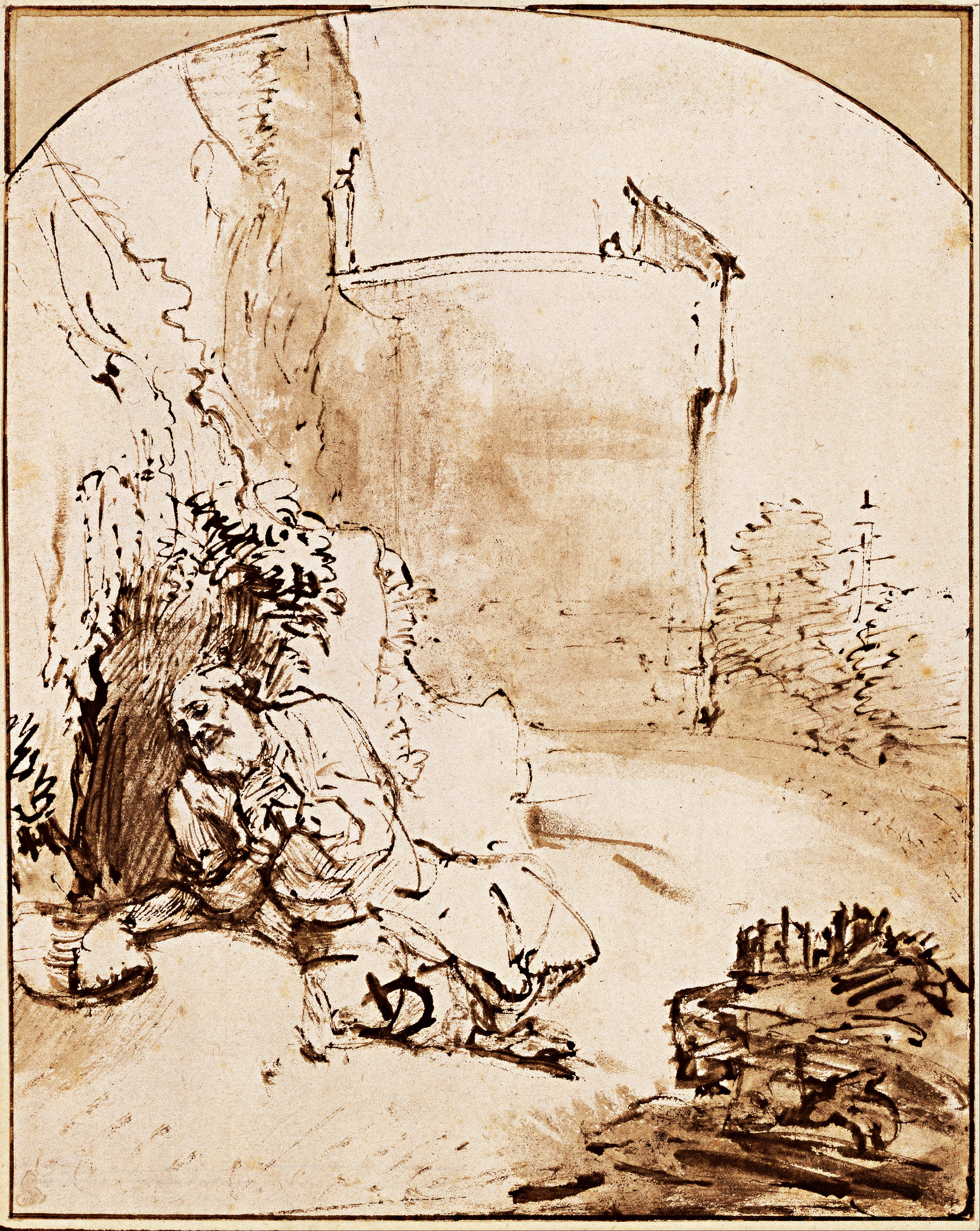
The Prophet Jonah before the Walls of Nineveh, drawing by Rembrandt, c. 1655

According to Isaiah 37:37–38 Nineveh was also the place where Sennacherib died at the hands of his two sons, who then fled to Ararat. The book of the minor prophet Nahum is almost exclusively taken up with prophetic denunciations against Nineveh. Its ruin and utter desolation are foretold in Nahum 1:14 and Nahum 3:19. In Nahum 2:6–11 its end was fortold to be strange, sudden, and tragic. According to Isaiah 10:5–19 it was God's doing, his judgment on Assyria's pride. In fulfillment of prophecy, God made "an utter end of the place". It became a "desolation". In Zephaniah 2:13–15 the minor prophet Zephaniah also predicts its destruction along with the fall of the empire of which it was the capital. Nineveh is also the setting of the Book of Tobit.

The Book of Jonah (Jonah 3:3 and Jonah 4:11), set in the days of the Assyrian Empire, describes it as an "exceedingly great city of three days' journey in breadth", whose population at that time is given as "more than 120,000". Genesis 10:11–12 lists four cities "Nineveh, Rehoboth, Calah, and Resen", ambiguously stating that either Resen or Calah is "the great city". The ruins of Kuyunjiq, Nimrud, Karamlesh and Khorsabad form the four corners of an irregular quadrilateral. The ruins of the "great city" Nineveh, with the whole area included within the parallelogram they form by lines drawn from the one to the other, are generally regarded as consisting of these four sites. The description of Nineveh in Jonah likely was a reference to greater Nineveh, including the surrounding cities of Rehoboth, Calah and Resen The Book of Jonah depicts Nineveh as a wicked city worthy of destruction. God sent Jonah to preach to the Ninevites of their coming destruction, and they fasted and repented because of this. As a result, God spared the city; when Jonah protests against this, God states he is showing mercy for the population who, according to Jonah 4:11), are ignorant of the difference between right and wrong ("who cannot discern between their right hand and their left hand" and mercy for the beasts in the city.

Nineveh's repentance and salvation from evil can be found in the Hebrew Tanakh, also known as the Old Testament, and referred to in Matthew 12:41 and Luke 11:32 and the Muslim Qur'an. To this day, Syriac and Oriental Orthodox churches commemorate the three days Jonah spent inside the fish during the Fast of Nineveh. Some Christians observe this holiday fast by refraining from food and drink, with churches encouraging followers to refrain from dairy products, fish and other meats.

== Archaeology ==
Carsten Niebuhr recorded its location during the 1761–1767 Danish expedition. Niebuhr wrote afterwards that "I did not learn that I was at so remarkable a spot, till near the river. Then they showed me a village on a great hill, which they call Nunia, and a mosque, in which the prophet Jonah was buried. Another hill in this district is called Kalla Nunia, or the Castle of Nineveh. On that lies a village Koindsjug." In 1820 the site was explored and described by archaeologist Claudius Rich. In 1842, the French Consul General at Mosul, Paul-Émile Botta, began to search the vast mounds that lay along the opposite bank of the river. While at Tell Kuyunjiq he had little success, the locals whom he employed in these excavations, to their great surprise, came upon the ruins of a building at the 20 km far-away mound of Khorsabad, which, on further exploration, turned out to be the royal palace of Sargon II, in which large numbers of reliefs were found and recorded, though they had been damaged by fire and were mostly too fragile to remove.

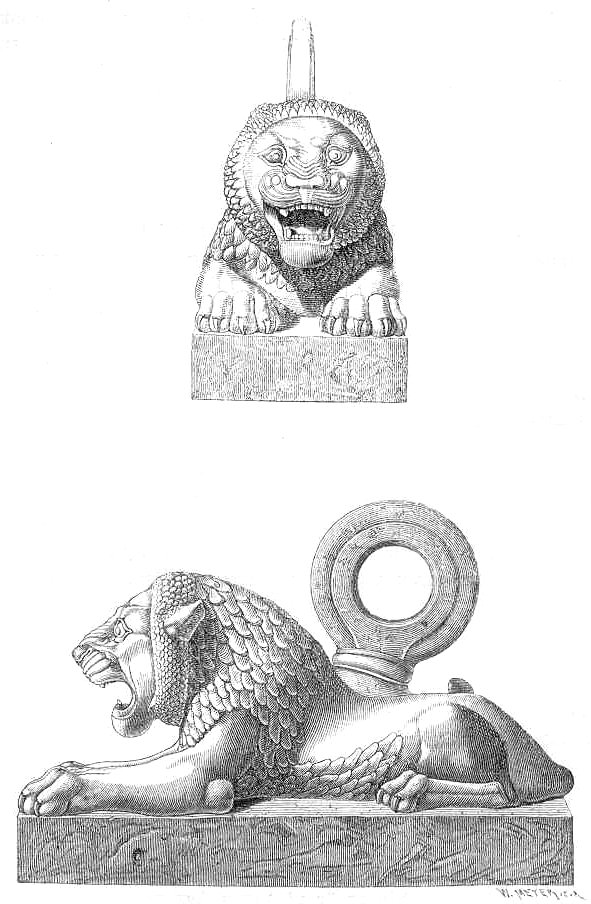
Bronze lion from Nineveh

In 1847 the young British diplomat Austen Henry Layard explored the ruins. Layard did not use modern archaeological methods; his stated goal was "to obtain the largest possible number of well preserved objects of art at the least possible outlay of time and money". In the Kuyunjiq mound, Layard rediscovered in 1849 the lost palace of Sennacherib with its 71 rooms and colossal bas-reliefs. He also unearthed the palace and famous library of Ashurbanipal with 22,000 cuneiform clay tablets. Most of Layard's material was sent to the British Museum, but some was dispersed elsewhere: two large pieces were given to Lady Charlotte Guest and these eventually found their way to the Metropolitan Museum.

The work of exploration was carried on by Hormuzd Rassam, George Smith and others, and a vast treasury of specimens of Assyria was incrementally exhumed for European museums. Palace after palace was discovered, with their decorations and their sculptured slabs, revealing the life and manners of this ancient people, their arts of war and peace, the forms of their religion, the style of their architecture, and the magnificence of their monarchs.

The mound of Tell Kuyunjiq was excavated again by the archaeologists of the British Museum, led by Leonard William King, between 1902 and 1904. Their efforts concentrated on the site of the Temple of Nabu where another cuneiform library was supposed to exist. However, no such library was ever found: most likely, it had been destroyed by the activities of later residents.

The excavations started again in 1927, under the direction of Campbell Thompson, who had taken part in King's expeditions. Some works were carried out outside Kuyunjiq, for instance on the mound of Tell Nebi Yunus, which was the ancient arsenal of Nineveh, or along the outside walls. Here, near the northwestern corner of the walls, beyond the pavement of a later building, the archaeologists found almost 300 fragments of prisms recording the royal annals of Sennacherib, Esarhaddon, and Ashurbanipal, beside a prism of Esarhaddon which was almost perfect.

After the Second World War, several excavations were carried out by Iraqi archaeologists. From 1951 to 1958, Mohammed Ali Mustafa worked the site. The work was continued from 1967 through 1971 by Tariq Madhloom. Some additional excavation occurred by Manhal Jabur from the early 1970s to 1987. For the most part, these digs focused on Tell Nebi Yunus.

The British archaeologist and Assyriologist Professor David Stronach of the University of California, Berkeley conducted a series of surveys and digs at the site from 1987 to 1990, focusing his attentions on the several gates and the existent mudbrick walls, as well as the system that supplied water to the city in times of siege. The excavation reports are in progress.

After Mosul’s liberation from the control of the Islamic State (IS), Peter A. Miglus, University of Heidelberg, established a rescue project in 2018, exploring and documenting the intrusive IS tunnels in the Assyrian Military Palace that is located below the destroyed Mosque of the prophet Jonah on Tell Nebi Yunus. Archaeological excavations have been conducted since 2019. Subsequently, an extensive research project, first under the direction of Stefan M. Maul and now of Aaron Schmidt, University of Heidelberg, developed, focusing also on other areas of Nineveh. At Tell Kuyunjiq, activities started in 2021 with rescue and restoration measures for the destroyed reliefs in the throne room wing of the Southwest Palace. Excavations in the North Palace commenced in 2022. Since 2023, work has also been conducted at the Nergal Gate, which was bulldozed by IS. In the lower town, geophysical surveys were carried out north of Kuyunjiq in 2021 and 2023 in preparation of future research on residential areas.

An Iraqi–Italian Archaeological Expedition by the Alma Mater Studiorum – University of Bologna and the Iraqi State Board of Antiquities and Heritage (SBAH), led by Nicolò Marchetti, began (with five campaigns having taken place between 2019 and 2023) a project aiming at the excavation, conservation and public presentation of the lower town of Nineveh. Work was carried out in nineteen excavation areas, from the Adad Gate – now completely repaired (after removing hundreds of tons of debris from ISIL's 2016 destructions), explored and protected with a new roof – deep into the Nebi Yunus town. In a few areas, a thick later stratigraphy was encountered, but the late 7th century BC stratum was reached everywhere (actually in two areas in the pre-Sennacherib lower town, the excavations already exposed older strata, up to the 11th century BC until now, aiming in the future at exploring the first settlement therein). In October 2023 an archaeological park was inaugurated at the site.

Since 2024, an expedition led by Tim Harrison of the ISAC at the University of Chicago has taken over from the University of Bologna the investigation of the eastern lower town at Nineveh. Later in June 2026, a six-foot-tall marble stele next to one of the gates was discovered by a team of archaeologists. Although the cuneiform wasn't fully translated, it is thought to be detailing the building projects of Ashurbanipal.

=== Archaeological remains ===
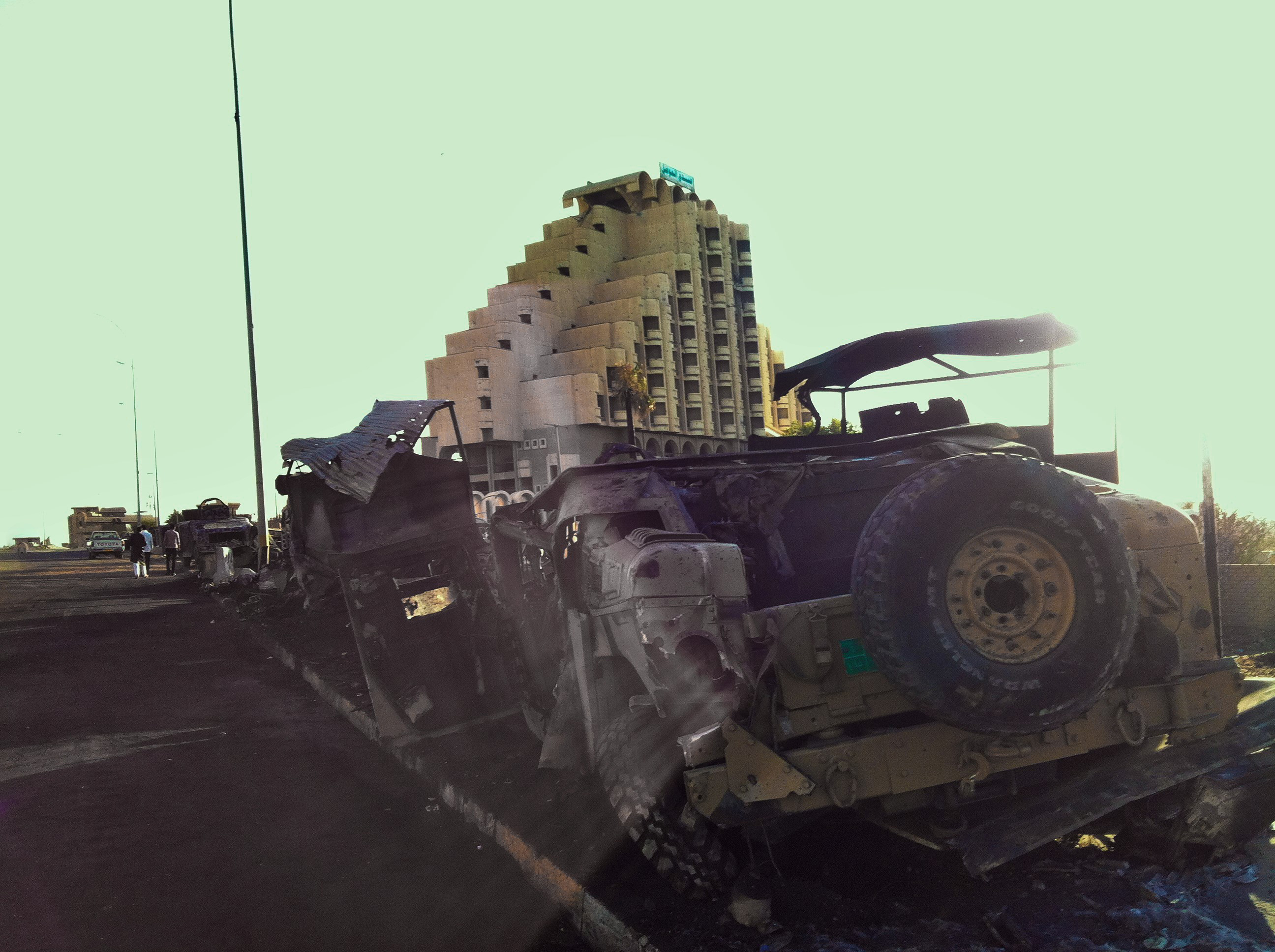
Humvee down after ISIL attack

The site is marked by two large mounds, Tell Kuyunjiq and Tell Nabī Yūnus "Prophet Jonah", and the remains of the city walls (about 12 kilometres (7 mi) in circumference), enclosing a vast lower town extensively encroached by modern buildings. The Neo-Assyrian levels of Kuyunjiq have been extensively explored. The other mound, Nabī Yūnus, has not been as extensively explored because there was an Arab Muslim shrine dedicated to that prophet on the site. On July 24, 2014, the Islamic State destroyed the shrine as part of a campaign to destroy religious sanctuaries it deemed "un-Islamic", but also to loot that site through tunneling.

The ruin mound of Tell Kuyunjiq rises about 20 metres (66 ft) above the surrounding plain of the ancient city. It is quite broad, measuring about 800 by 500 metres (2,625 ft × 1,640 ft). Its upper layers have been extensively excavated, and several Neo-Assyrian palaces and temples have been found there. A deep sounding by Max Mallowan revealed evidence of habitation as early as the 6th millennium BC. Today, there is little evidence of these old excavations other than weathered pits and earth piles. In 1990, the only Assyrian remains visible were those of the entry court and the first few chambers of the Palace of Sennacherib. Since that time, the palace chambers have received significant damage by looters and by the removal of the protective roof. Portions of relief sculptures that were in the palace chambers in 1990 were seen on the antiquities market by 1996. Photographs of the chambers made in 2003 show that many of the fine relief sculptures there have been reduced to piles of rubble and a conservation effort ensued. In 2016 Sennacherib's throne room was bulldozed by Daesh and the sculpted fragments were left exposed until 2022.

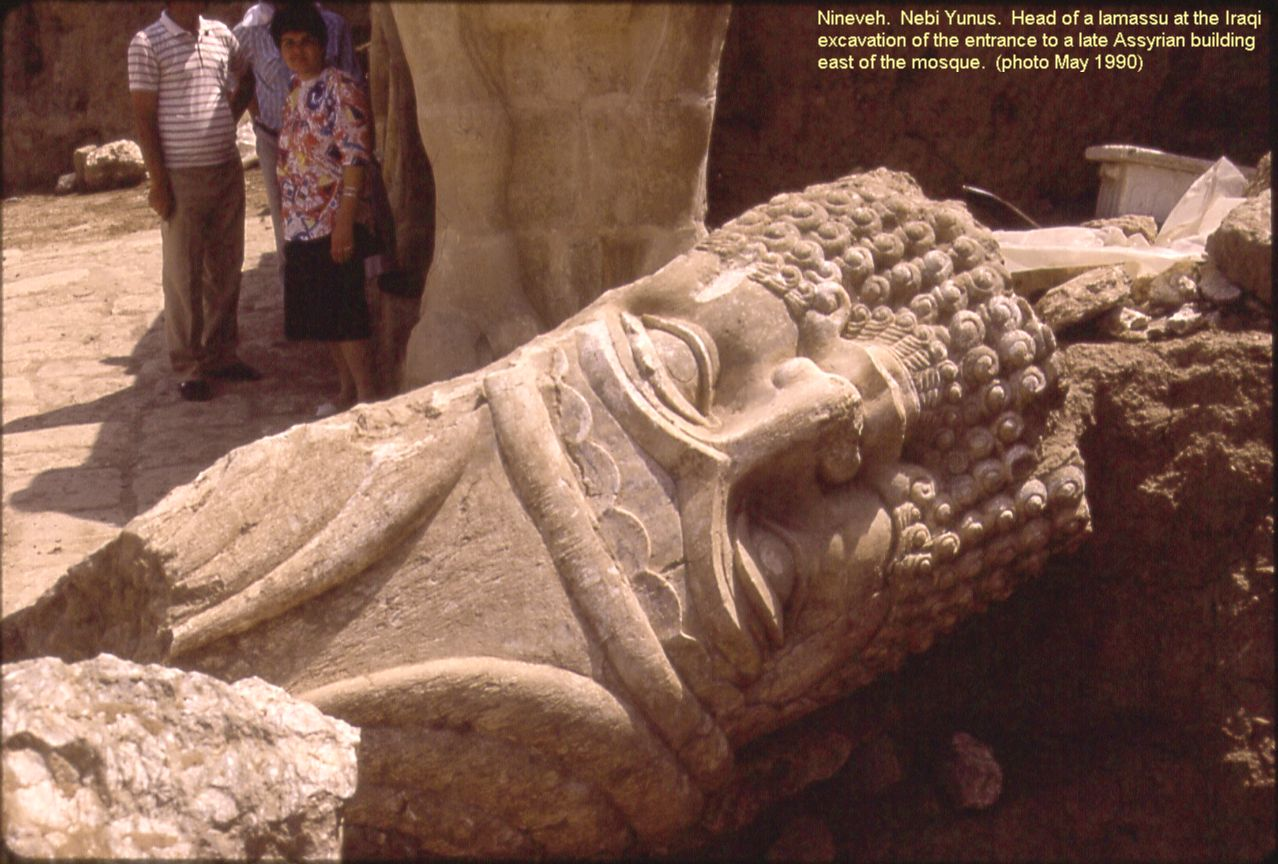
Winged Bull excavated at Tell Nebi Yunus by Iraqi archaeologists

Tell Nebi Yunus is located about 1 kilometre (0.6 mi) south of Kuyunjiq and is the secondary ruin mound at Nineveh. On the basis of texts of Sennacherib, the site has traditionally been identified as the "armory" of Nineveh, and a gate and pavements excavated by Iraqis in 1954 have been considered to be part of the "armory" complex. Excavations in 1990 revealed a monumental entryway consisting of a number of large inscribed orthostats and "bull-man" sculptures, some apparently unfinished. Following the liberation of Mosul, the tunnels under Tell Nebi Yunus were explored in 2018, in which a 3000-year-old palace was discovered, including a pair of reliefs, each showing a row of women, along with reliefs of lamassu.

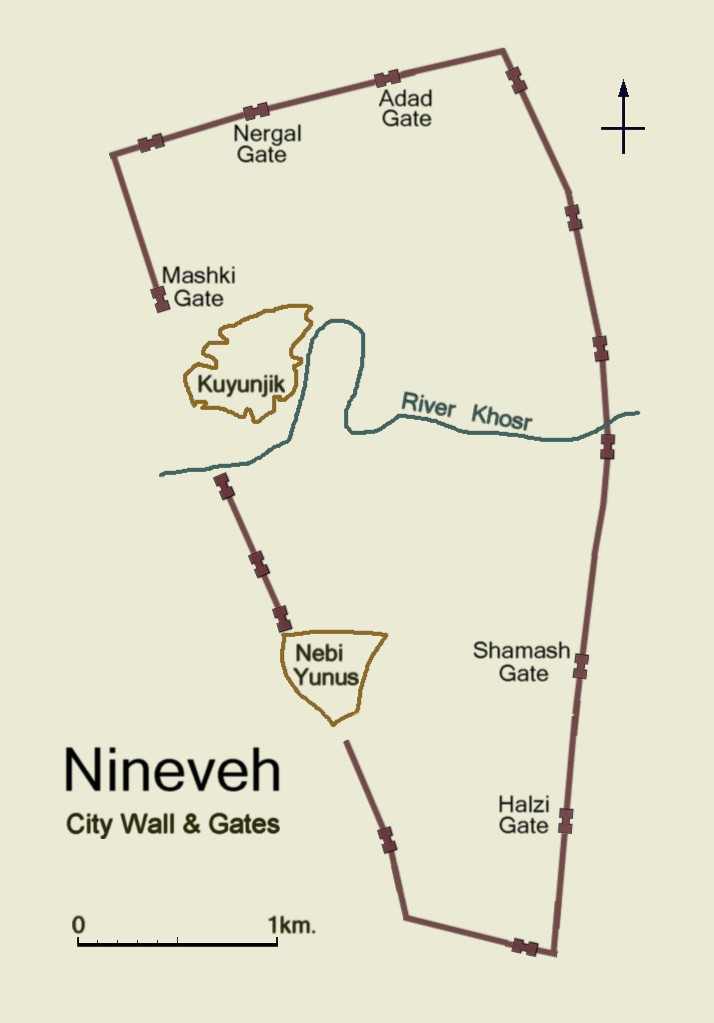
Simplified plan of ancient Nineveh showing city wall and location of gateways

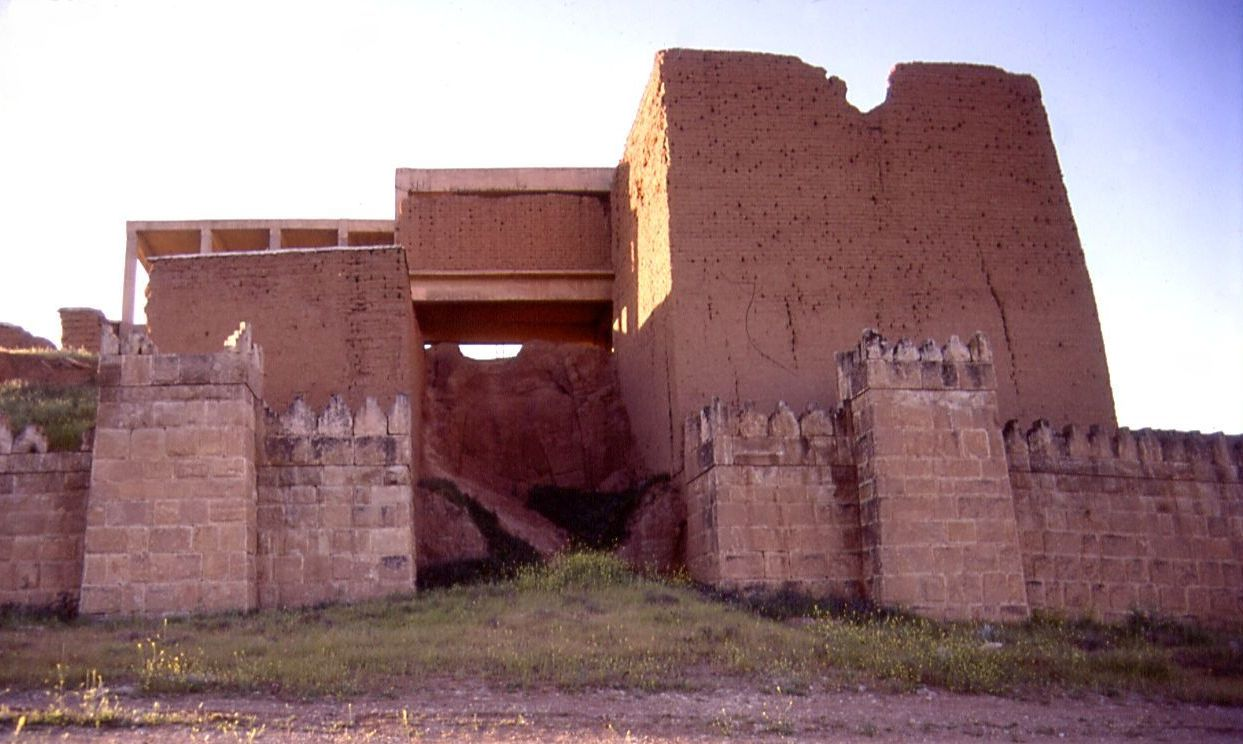
Photograph of the restored Adad Gate, taken prior to the gate's destruction by IS in April 2016

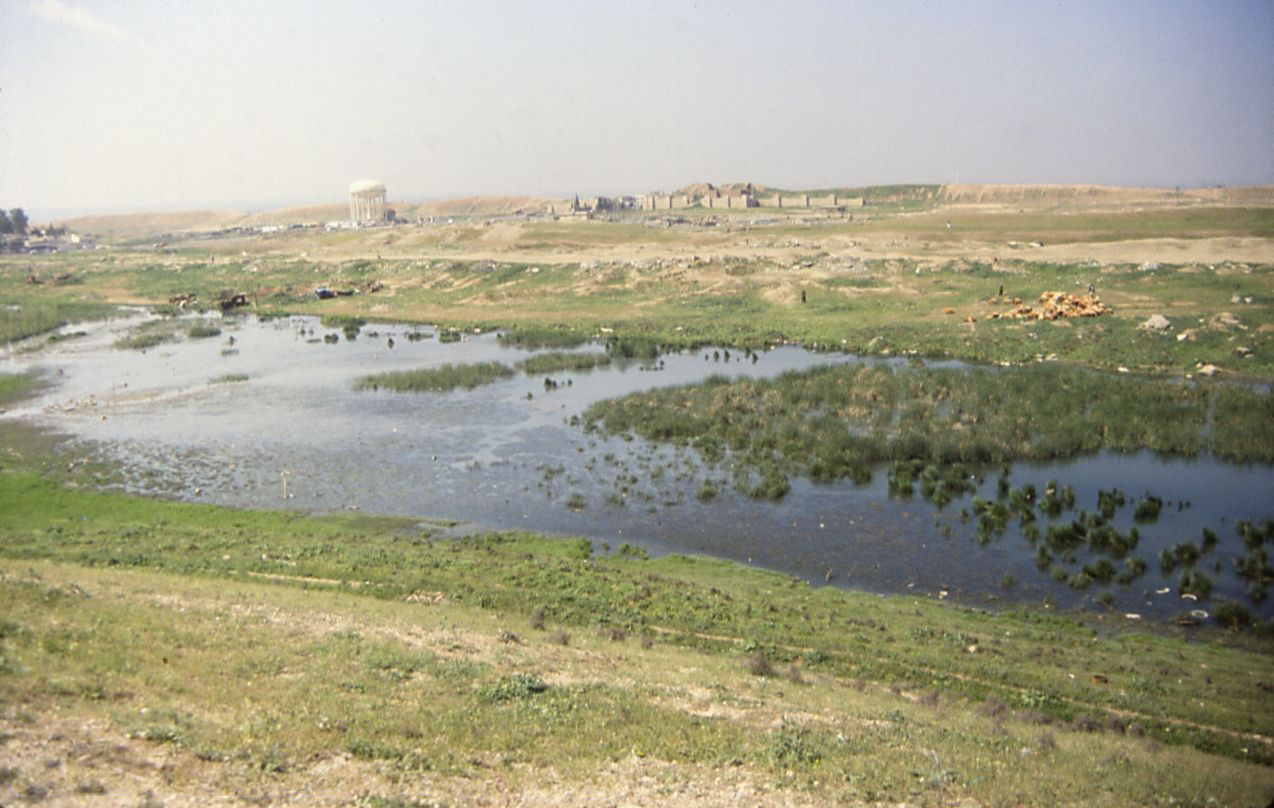
Eastern city wall and Shamash Gate

The ruins of Nineveh are surrounded by the remains of a massive stone and mudbrick wall dating from about 700 BC. About 12 km in length, the wall system consisted of an ashlar stone retaining wall about 6 metres (20 ft) high surmounted by a mudbrick wall about 10 metres (33 ft) high and 15 metres (49 ft) thick. The stone retaining wall had projecting stone towers spaced about every 18 metres (59 ft). The stone wall and towers were topped by three-step merlons.

Six of the gateways have been explored to some extent by archaeologists (besides the possible Sin Gate at the north-west end of the site):

- Mashki Gate (Note: Masqi Gate (Arabic: بوابة مسقي, derived from the passive participle of سَقَى, saqā, 'to give (sb) a drink, to water, to irrigate')) was perhaps used to take livestock to water from the Tigris which currently flows about 1.5 kilometres (0.9 mi) to the west. It has been reconstructed in fortified mudbrick to the height of the top of the vaulted passageway. The Assyrian original may have been plastered and ornamented. It was bulldozed along with the Nergal and Adad Gates during IS occupation. During the restoration project, seven damaged alabaster carvings from the time of Sennacherib were found at the gate in 2022.
- Nergal Gate: Named for the god Nergal, it may have been used for some ceremonial purpose, as it is the only known gate flanked by stone sculptures of winged bull-men (lamassu). The reconstruction is conjectural, as the gate was excavated by Layard in the mid-19th century and reconstructed in the mid-20th century. The lamassu on this gate were defaced with a jackhammer by IS forces and the gate was utterly destroyed.
- Adad Gate: Named for the god Adad. A roofing above it was begun in the late 1960s by Iraqis but was not completed. The result was a mixture of concrete and eroding mudbrick, which nonetheless does give some idea of the original structure. The excavator left some features unexcavated, allowing a view of the original Assyrian construction. The original brickwork of the outer vaulted passageway was well exposed, as was the entrance of the vaulted stairway to the upper levels. The actions of Nineveh's last defenders could be seen in the hastily built mudbrick construction, which narrowed the passageway from 4 to 2 metres (13 to 7 ft). Around April 13, 2016, IS demolished both the gate and the adjacent wall by flattening them with a bulldozer. It has been reexcavated (including a 7 m deep stair-well), conservated and presented to the public by the Iraqi-Italian expedition between 2019 and 2023.
- Shamash Gate: Named for the sun god Shamash, it opens to the road to Erbil. It was excavated by Layard in the 19th century. The stone retaining wall and part of the mudbrick structure were reconstructed in the 1960s. The mudbrick reconstruction has deteriorated significantly. The stone wall projects outward about 20 metres (66 ft) from the line of main wall for a width of about 70 metres (230 ft). It is the only gate with such a significant projection. The mound of its remains towers above the surrounding terrain. Its size and design suggest it was the most important gate in Neo-Assyrian times. It is now being excavated by the University of Chicago expedition.
- Halzi Gate: Near the south end of the eastern city wall. Exploratory excavations were undertaken here by the University of California, Berkeley expedition of 1989–1990 and again in 2022 and 2023 by the Iraqi-Italian Expedition. There is an outward projection of the city wall, though not as pronounced as at the Shamash Gate. The entry passage had been narrowed with mudbrick to about 2 metres (7 ft) as at the Adad Gate. Human remains from the final battle of Nineveh were found in the passageway. Located in the eastern wall, it is the southernmost and largest of all the remaining gates of ancient Nineveh.
- A new gate was discovered in 2021 to the north of the Shamash Gate and south of the Khosr river (in the area labeled as N by the Iraqi-Italian expedition), next to a spectacular water tunnel running for 42 m under the 31m-thick city wall (area G, excavated in 2020 and 2021).

== Threats to the site ==
The site of Nineveh is exposed to decay of its reliefs by a lack of proper protective roofing, vandalism, and looting holes dug into chamber floors. Future preservation is further compromised by the site's proximity to expanding suburbs.

The ailing Mosul Dam is a persistent threat to Nineveh as well as the city of Mosul. This is in no small part due to years of disrepair (in 2006, the U.S. Army Corps of Engineers cited it as the most dangerous dam in the world), the cancellation of a second dam project in the 1980s to act as flood relief in case of failure, and occupation by ISIL in 2014 resulting in fleeing workers and stolen equipment. If the dam fails, the entire site could be under as much as 45 feet (14 m) of water.

A major threat to Nineveh has been deliberate human actions by ISIL or Daesh, which occupied the area between 2014 and 2017. In early 2015, they first announced their intention to destroy the walls of Nineveh if the Iraqis tried to liberate the city, and they also threatened the destruction of archaeological heritage and artifacts. On February 26, 2015, video footage shows IS smashing statues and artifacts at the Mosul Museum. They are believed to have plundered others to sell overseas. The items were mostly from the Assyrian exhibit, which Daesh declared blasphemous and idolatrous. There were 300 items remaining in the museum out of a total of 1,900, with the other 1,600 being taken to the National Museum of Iraq in Baghdad for security reasons prior to the 2014 Fall of Mosul. Some of the artifacts sold and/or destroyed were from Nineveh. Just a few days after the destruction of the museum pieces, Daesh terrorists demolished parts of three other major UNESCO world heritage sites, Khorsabad, Nimrud and Hatra. In 2016, Daesh effectively destroyed the Adad Gate (along with the adjoining northern city walls, now cleared by the Iraqi-Italian expedition thanks to the support of the Kaplan Fund), as well as the Mashki Gate (along with the eastern fortifications. The Mashki Gate is in the process of being restored). Daesh also called for intensive new housing in the Kuyunjiq part and opened a large road across the southern part of the site (currently known as Al Asady Road).

After the cultural destruction and between 2014-2019, international efforts by archeologists began recording, evaluating and monitoring the damage and destruction inflicted on sensitive archaeological contexts in Nineveh, using satellite-based remote sensing. The results found that a few high-profile acts of deliberate vandalism were accompanied by much more extensive damage caused by construction and rubbish dumping extending across substantial parts of the site.

Thanks to the activities of the Iraqi-Italian expedition, an archaeological park has been opened at Kuyunjiq since 2023: tourists enter from the Adad gate, subsequently visiting the small Neo-Assyrian palace where the cuneiform library was discovered in 2021, and may then relax in the VW Foundation-funded KALAM mudbrick information center nearby. The site is still endangered, however, with dumping of debris, illegal settlements and economic activities (such as illegal generators for electricity, pipe companies etc.) as the main threats.

== Rogation of the Ninevites (Nineveh's Wish) ==
Members of the Ancient Church of the East, Chaldean Catholic Church, Syriac Catholic Church, Syriac Orthodox Church, Assyrian Church of the East and Saint Thomas Christians of the Syro-Malabar Church observe a fast called Ba'uta d-Ninwe (ܒܥܘܬܐ ܕܢܝܢܘܐ) which means Nineveh's Prayer. Copts and Ethiopian Orthodox also maintain this fast.

== In popular culture ==
English Romantic poet Edwin Atherstone wrote an epic titled The Fall of Nineveh. The work tells of an uprising against king Sardanapalus by all the nations that were dominated by the Assyrian Empire. He is a great criminal who had one hundred prisoners of war executed. After a long struggle, the town is conquered by Median and Babylonian troops, led by prince Arbaces and priest Belesis. The king then sets his own palace on fire and dies inside together with all his concubines.

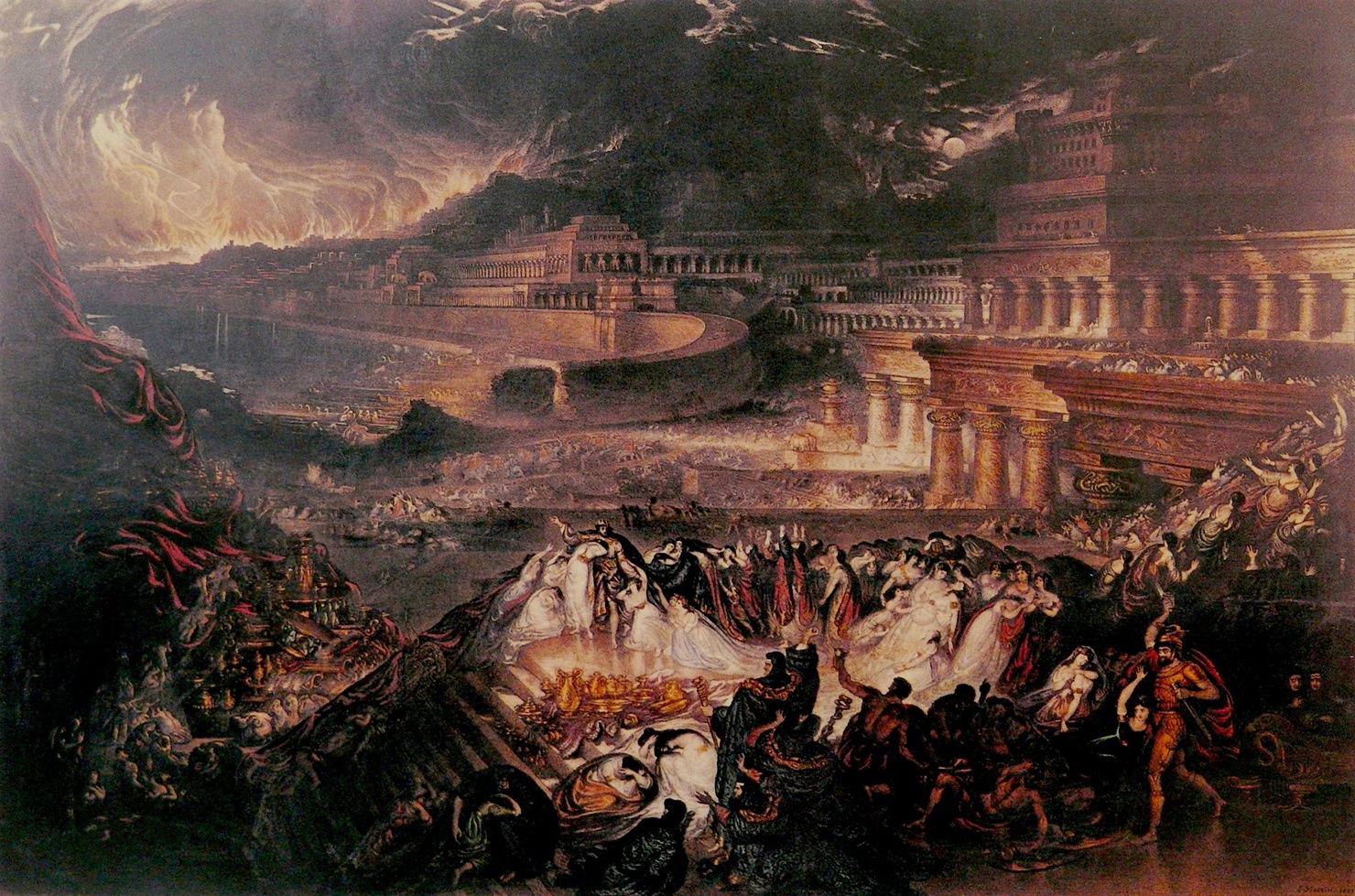
John Martin, The Fall of Nineveh

Atherstone's friend, artist John Martin, created a painting of the same name inspired by the poem. English poet John Masefield's well-known, fanciful 1903 poem Cargoes mentions Nineveh in its first line. Nineveh is also mentioned in Rudyard Kipling's 1897 poem Recessional and Arthur O'Shaughnessy's 1873 poem Ode.

In Warhammer 40,000, the perpetual Ollanius Persson is said to be born in Nineveh.

== See also ==
- Cities of the ancient Near East
- Destruction of cultural heritage by the Islamic State
- Historical urban community sizes
- Isaac of Nineveh
- List of megalithic sites
- Nanshe
- Qurnah disaster
- Short chronology timeline
