= Medo-Persian conflict =

Military conflict between the Median kingdom and Persis

- Part of the Campaigns of Cyrus the Great
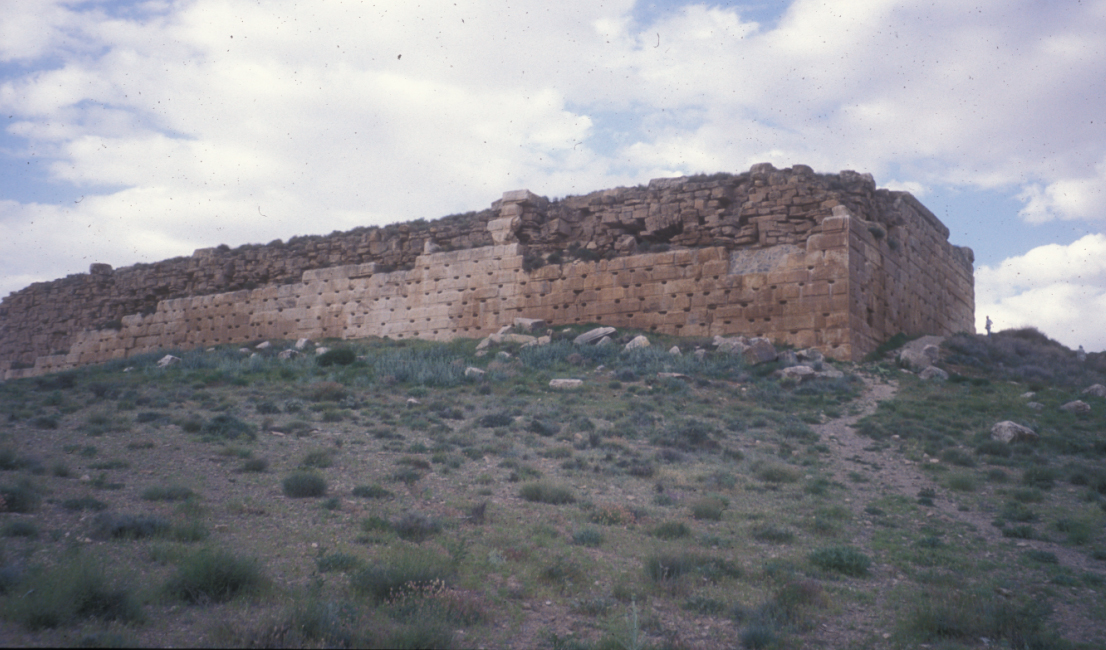
- Pasargadae Citadel
Date	554/553–550 BCE?
Location	Persis, Media
Result	Persian victory
Territorial changes	Media and its vassals subjugated by the Persians, who thus created the Achaemenid Empire; Fall of the Median Kingdom; Most of the Median men refuse to fight and joins Cyrus the Great side

Belligerents
Median Kingdom	Achaemenids

Commanders and leaders
Astyages (POW) (surrendered); Harpagus (early)	Cyrus the Great; Oebares; Harpagus

The Medo-Persian conflict was a campaign led by the Median king Astyages against Persis in the mid 6th-century BCE. Classical sources claim that Persis had been a vassal of the Median kingdom that revolted against Median rule, but this is not confirmed by contemporary evidence. After some battles the Persians led by Cyrus the Great emerged victorious, subsequently conquering Median territories and establishing the Achaemenid Empire.

The main sources on the conflict are the Histories of the Greek historian Herodotus and two cuneiform inscriptions of the Babylonian king Nabonidus. The Babylonian texts suggest that the decisive battle and the capture of Ecbatana, the capital of Media, were only the climax of the Medo-Persian hostilities that lasted for at least three years (553-550 BCE).

== Dating ==
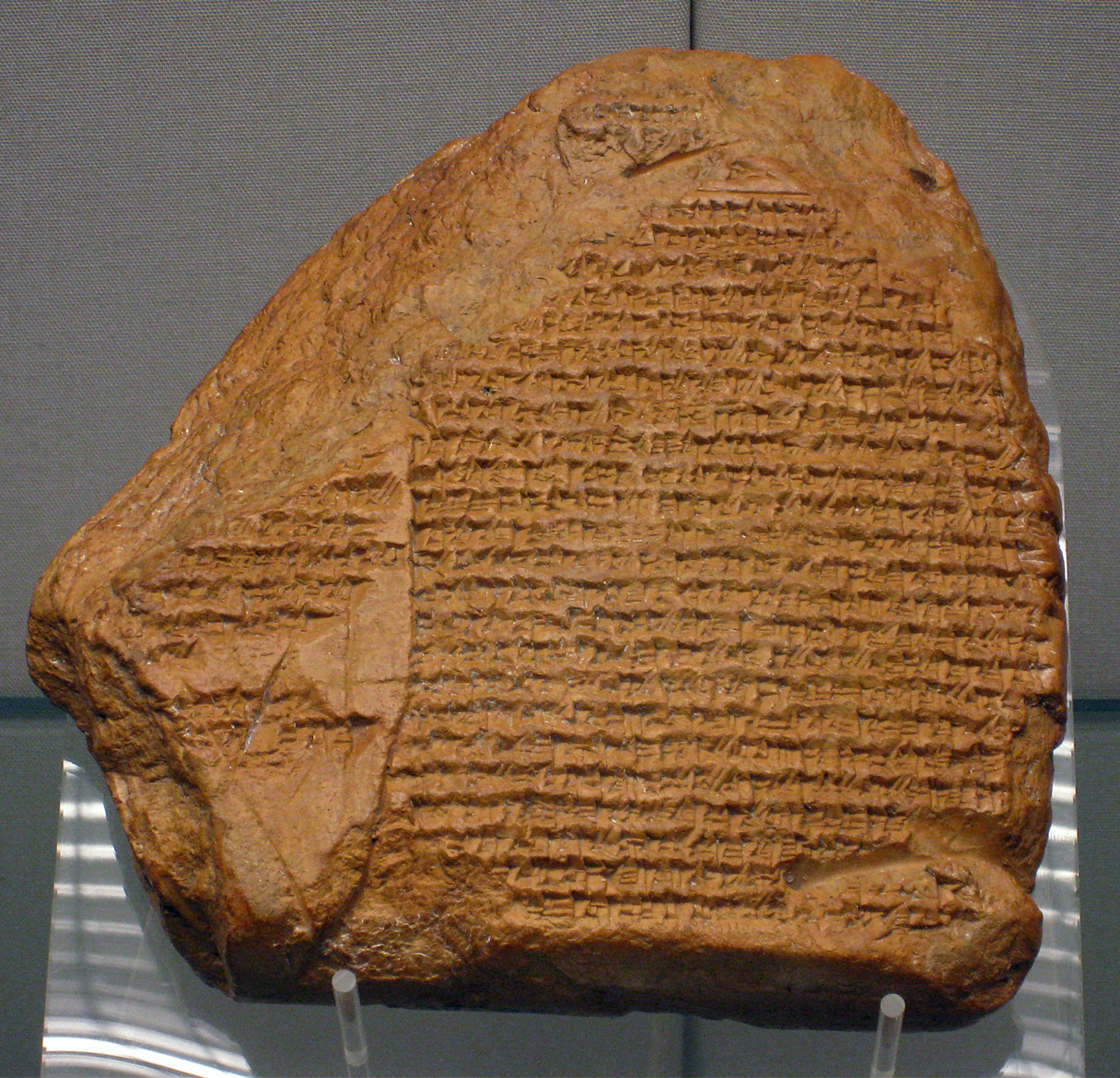
The Nabonidus Chronicle, an ancient Babylonian document now on display at the British Museum

The date of this conflict is somewhat problematic. As seen in the Cylinder of Sippar, the conflict began in the third year of Nabonidus' reign, which is in 553 BCE, and the Nabonidus Chronicle seems to date the defeat of Media in the sixth year of Nabonidus (i.e., 550 BCE). However, some modern scholars consider this unreliable. According to these scholars, there is no reason to assume that Nabonidus's chronicle dated the defeat of Media in the sixth year of Nabonidus' reign. The earlier part of the text in the chronicle is broken, and therefore, the year of the occurrence is unknown. It is true that immediately after mentioning the defeat of the Medes, the text continues with an account of events in the seventh year of Nabonidus, but not every year is covered in the chronicle. Robert Drews suggested that, by relying solely on Nabonidus's chronicle, the defeat of the Medes could only be dated to a period between the first and sixth years of Nabonidus' reign, that is, between 554 and 550 BCE because the numbers indicating the first six years of Nabonidus' reign were interrupted in the chronicle. Furthermore, based on the Cylinder of Sippar, Drews was inclined to date the Persian victory in the revolt to the years 554-553 BCE. According to this specific source, the Median army was indeed defeated by the Persians in 553 BCE. However, it is likely that this defeat was just one in a long series of hostilities and not the most decisive one. Therefore, the date of the Persian victory still cannot be definitively determined.

== Background ==
=== Vassal status of Persia ===
Persia (in yellow) on the map

The Persians, likely under the mythical king Achaemenes, founded a small state near the Elamite borders. His successor, Teispes, expanded the kingdom by conquering Anshan and Fars. Teispes seems to have divided the territory of the Persian kingdom between his eldest son, Cyrus I, who was given the land and city of Anshan, and his younger son, Ariaramnes, who received Persis. In the second half of the 7th century, both Persian kingdoms would have been subjugated by the Medes, becoming vassals of the Median king. It is uncertain whether the Persians truly acknowledged any submission to the Median kings. Herodotus and Nicolaus of Damascus consider Persia as a country subject to Media, while Xenophon and Moses of Chorene, on the contrary, seem to consider Persia as entirely independent from Media. It is true that Persia continued to be ruled by its own native kings throughout the Median period. Persian records imply Persian independence, but national pride could lead to dissimulation in such a case. It's possible that there may have been some recognition of Median sovereignty by the Persian kings, although such recognition may not have been much more than a formality and may not have imposed onerous obligations. The idea that Persia was a vassal of Media rests on later classical sources and is considered unlikely by some scholars.

=== Rise of Cyrus ===
After Cyrus I, Anshan was ruled by Cambyses I (r. 600-559 BCE). If credibility is given to the information provided by Herodotus, Xenophon, Diodorus, and some other classical authors, Cambyses I was married to Mandane, the daughter of the Median king Astyages (r. 585-550 BCE). Therefore, his son Cyrus II was the grandson of Astyages. According to Herodotus, Astyages had a dream that was interpreted by the court Magi as meaning that his grandson, the son of Mandane, would take his place on the throne. After Cyrus was born, Astyages ordered the general Harpagus to kill the child. Harpagus delegated this task to the herdsman Mithridates, but he decided to raise Cyrus as his own son instead. Ten years later, Astyages discovered that Cyrus was alive and then punished Harpagus by offering him his own son at a banquet. After being questioned by Astyages, the Magi claimed that the king no longer needed to fear danger from his grandson, asserting that the dream had already come true, as Cyrus had become king while playing with other children. Astyages then calmed down and sent his grandson to his parents in Persia.

In 558 BC, Cyrus II, called "the Great" by the Greeks, became the king of the Persian tribes, with the Pasargadae holding the most important position among them. The center of the Persian state was located around the city of Pasargadae, where an intensive construction program began in the early years of Cyrus's reign. Under his rule, the two Persian kingdoms were united once again, but Cyrus still owed allegiance to the Median king.

=== Medo-Babylonian hostility ===
The powers of the Middle East around 600 BCE: Lydia (in blue), Media (in yellow), Babylon (in dark green) and Egypt (in light green)

At the time when Cyrus II became king of the Persians, there were four powerful states in the entire Near East: Media, Lydia, Babylon, and Egypt. Media and Babylon were initially allies, but their relations began to deteriorate, leading both Babylonian and Median kings to willingly accept refugees from each other's territories. Nebuchadnezzar II (r. 605-562 BCE) was concerned that Media might cease to be an ally and become a dangerous rival. A letter addressed to Nebuchadnezzar indicates that in 591 BCE, relations between Media and Babylon had become tense. The letter states that several Babylonians had ignored the king's order and fled to Media. However, if Herodotus is to be credited, relations between Babylon were still reasonably good in 585 BCE when Media and Lydia concluded a peace treaty mediated by Syennesis I, the king of Cilicia, and a certain Labynetus from Babylon.

After the death of Nebuchadnezzar II in 562 BCE, Babylon entered a period of political crisis caused in part by the conflict between Chaldean and Aramaean tribes, and partly by tensions between priestly and military factions. There was a succession of three kings in a few years until Nabonidus (r. 556-539 BC) took power in May 556 BCE. Nabonidus did not have good relations with the Medes. According to his inscriptions, in his first year of reign, Nabonidus received orders from the god Marduk in a dream to restore the temple of Ehulhul in Harran, a city in northern Mesopotamia that had been under Median control since the fall of Assyria. The temple had been destroyed by the Medes in 609 BCE during the Assyrian wars and had been in ruins since then. In the dream, Marduk assured that the Medes would no longer be an obstacle to the restoration of the temple.

Media was already preparing for an attack on Babylon, and the relationship between the two countries was mutually tense, as evidenced by the anti-Median tone of Babylonian inscriptions from this period. The worsening relations between the two countries are also reflected in the words of the Hebrew prophet Jeremiah, composed a few decades before Cyrus's revolt against Astyages.

== Conflict ==
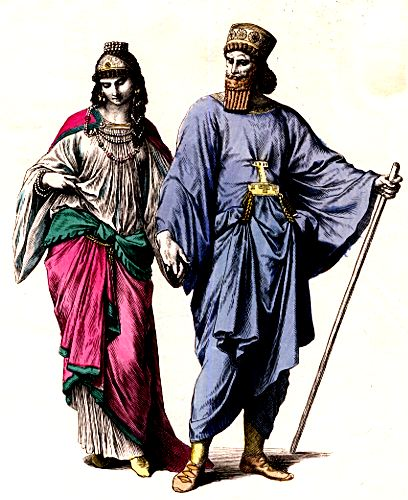
Artistic representation of Mede nobles

Extensive accounts of the revolt and the ensuing war have been passed down by classical authors. Some important, albeit somewhat scarce, information is provided by Babylonian texts. The Babylonian sources corroborate certain points and clarify others in the material provided by classical authors.

According to the Greek historian Herodotus (I 123–128), the Median general Harpagus, who had been cruelly insulted by Astyages, decided to seek revenge against his king and initiated a conspiracy. He rallied the dissatisfied Median nobility to his side, and later incited Cyrus to revolt. With the help of a trusted servant, Harpagus sent a letter to Cyrus in Persia. In the letter, Harpagus promised Cyrus that if he chose to revolt against Astyages, he would have the guaranteed support of many Median nobles, and Harpagus himself would join him along with his troops. Herodotus's account should be critically examined, but it does seem that there was indeed a group of nobles in Media who were unhappy with Astyages' policies and were prepared to defect to their enemies' side. I. M. Diakonoff and I. G. Aliev proposed the hypothesis that this group consisted of representatives of tribal nobility against whom Astyages had fought in his efforts to establish a strong and centralized state. It's possible that the conspiracy of the Median nobility only materialized during the time of the war with the rebels and may not have on its own led to the start of the rebellion, as Herodotus claims. According to Herodotus, after learning the content of Harpagus's letter, Cyrus convened a meeting of Persian tribes, including the Pasargadae, Maraphii, and Maspii, and then read aloud to them an edict he had drafted, claiming he had received it from Astyages. In this edict, Cyrus asserted that Astyages had appointed him as the commander of the army. Cyrus then began persuading the Persians to defect from Astyages, promising that the success of the revolt would guarantee them an easier life. The Persians, who resented Median rule, willingly responded to their leader's call. When Astyages learned that Cyrus was preparing a revolt, he sent a messenger to summon him to the Median court in Ecbatana. Cyrus's refusal to obey Astyages was the signal for the rebellion. The outcome of the revolt was decided in two battles. In the first battle, Astyages did not participate, and his general Harpagus, in command of the Median army, defected with a large portion of the troops to Cyrus's side. Astyages then ordered the impalement of the Magi who had misinterpreted his dream, possibly some of whom had been in contact with the conspirators, and all Medes, including the old and the young, were to be armed. Despite his advanced age, Astyages personally led the army in the second battle, but the Medes were defeated, and the king was taken prisoner. Cyrus did not harm Astyages in any way; in fact, he treated him with mercy. Thus, according to Herodotus, ended Astyages' 35-year reign and the Median domination of 128 years in Asia.

Despite the treachery of Harpagus, it is said by classical authors that Cyrus's victory was difficult and took time to achieve. Polyaenus reported three battles in which Cyrus was defeated, while in the fourth battle, he obtained a victory. He also claims that after the initial defeats, "many Persians deserted to the Medes." The violence and turmoil of the hostilities that unfolded in Persia are equally emphasized by Nicolaus of Damascus. Nicolaus also relayed a lengthy account of these events, embellished with legendary motifs and essentially echoes that of Ctesias. In his version, Cyrus, while in the service of Astyages in Media, came into contact with a certain groom named Oebares, who was a slave to a Mede. Astyages cruelly punished Oebares for some offense. As a result, Oebares conspired against the king and incited Cyrus to lead a revolt against the Medes. And so, the war began. The first battle lasted for two days and resulted in Astyages's complete victory. Having been defeated so close to their border with Media, the Persians fled to Pasargadae. According to Ctesias, Cyrus defeated the Median forces near the town of Hyrba (whose location remains unknown), but in the following fight Astyages gained the upper hand, and the Persians fled back to Pasargadae. Justin (I 6) relates that when Astyages was beginning to lose the battle, he placed special troops behind his lines with orders to kill any defectors. The ensuing battle, according to Nicolaus, took place near Parsagadae and also continued for two days. On the first day success was with the Median troops, but on the second day, the fleeing Persians, being shamed by their wives, started to fight in a more determined manner. The army of Cyrus achieved a crushing victory and the Persians captured the camp of the Medes. Astyages then executed his generals, on the grounds that the defeat had been their fault (Diodorus, IX 24, also reports the generals execution). Finding no support among his subjects, Astyages fled to Ecbatana and hid in the palace.

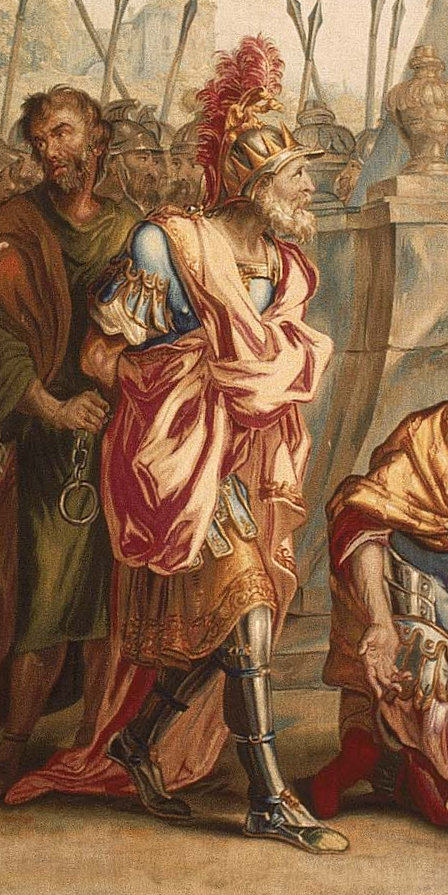
Astyages in chains being taken to Cyrus

Cyrus resumed the offensive against Media and took Ecbatana. Astyages probably relied on the city's fortifications to offer prolonged resistance: according to Ctesias, he was captured while hiding in the attic of the royal palace along with his daughter and son-in-law Spitamas. According to Nicolaus of Damascus, Astyages did manage to escape and was captured only as a result of another battle. This last battle is said to have taken place very close to Pasargadae. While there is no evidence to contradict that it occurred in the Murghab plain, due to the uncertainties surrounding the context of the revolt, we cannot place too much confidence in this location. According to Strabo (XV 3.8), after Cyrus's victory, Astyages, with what remained of his troops, fled to Median territory and was easily captured. Xenophon, in his Cyropaedia, recounts that Astyages died peacefully in his bed as the king of Media and that Cyrus's conquests were carried out in the capacity of his grandfather's general, the king of Media. However, Xenophon must have been aware of the true turn of events because in the Anabasis (III 4.8-12), he reported on the war between the Persians and the Medes, while in the Cyropaedia, historical facts seem to have been intentionally obscured to idealize Cyrus.

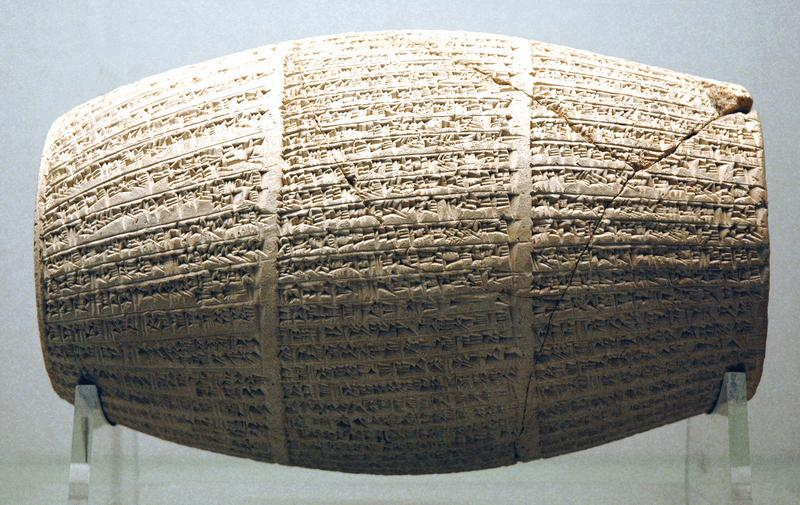
Nabonidus Cylinder Sippar

In addition to the accounts presented by classical authors, there is an authentic contemporary account of the revolt in a very brief form, found in two inscriptions of the Babylonian king Nabonidus. The information provided by the Babylonian sources broadly supports Herodotus's story. The Cylinder of Sippar reports that in 553 BCE, Cyrus rebelled against the Medes and with his small army, he defeated the many Median troops and captured Astyages, bringing him in chains to his land. It is possible that after the start of the revolt in 553 BCE, the Medes withdraw his garrison from Harran. Taking advantage of Astyages' difficulties, the Babylonians captured Harran around 552 BCE. The historian Paul-Alain Beaulieu believes it's possible that Nabonidus may have encouraged Cyrus to rebel and wage war against the Medes, and may have even allied with him, as Nabonidus's stay in Tayma coincides with the beginning of Cyrus's revolt. However, there is a lack of information to support this hypothesis. It is likely that Astyages's defeat in 553 BC was just one in a long series of hostilities and not the most decisive one. Nabonidus Chronicle, probably reporting events in 550 BCE, states that Astyages summoned his troops and marched against Cyrus, but his army rebelled against him, captured him, and handed him over to Cyrus. Cyrus then marched to the Median capital, Ecbatana, and conquered it, taking many spoils to Persia. The capture of the Median royal treasury represented a remarkable sign of his newfound power, and Oebares was responsible for transporting them to Persia. This booty was certainly of great practical importance; as far as we know, it was the first time that Cyrus had boundless resources at his disposal for the campaigns that lay ahead.

The Babylonian account agrees with Herodotus, confirming that Astyages attacked Cyrus and was captured. How Cyrus possessed the capability to defeat the Medes, and the motivations behind Astyages' attack on him, are aspects that remain unknown. It is possible that the Medes might have asserted some kind of suzerainty over Anshan, which the Persians challenged. Alternatively, Persian expansionist actions might have provoked an aggressive response from the Medes. It's possible that the rise of Persia and the fall of Media had deeper economic causes. It appears that in the mid-6th century BC, qanats (underground irrigation channels) were excavated in Persia, giving this part of Iran a competitive advantage over Media. However, it's possible that this development occurred after Cyrus's victory over the Medes. In addition to the army's betrayal, the fall of Media was also facilitated by a dynastic crisis. According to the two sources available, Astyages did not have a male heir. Herodotus and Xenophon, in fact, claim that Astyages had a daughter named Mandane, whom they make the mother of Cyrus, while Ctesias denied the truth of this claim and attributed to him a daughter named Amytis. Media also did not receive assistance from Lydia, a country with which it had formed alliances in 585 BC, perhaps because Lydia was too far from the conflict zone to provide effective help.

=== Battles ===
- Battle of Hyrba (552 BCE)
- Battle of the Persian Border (551 BCE)
- Siege of Pasargadae Hill (550 BCE)
- Battle of Pasargadae (550 BCE)

== Aftermath ==
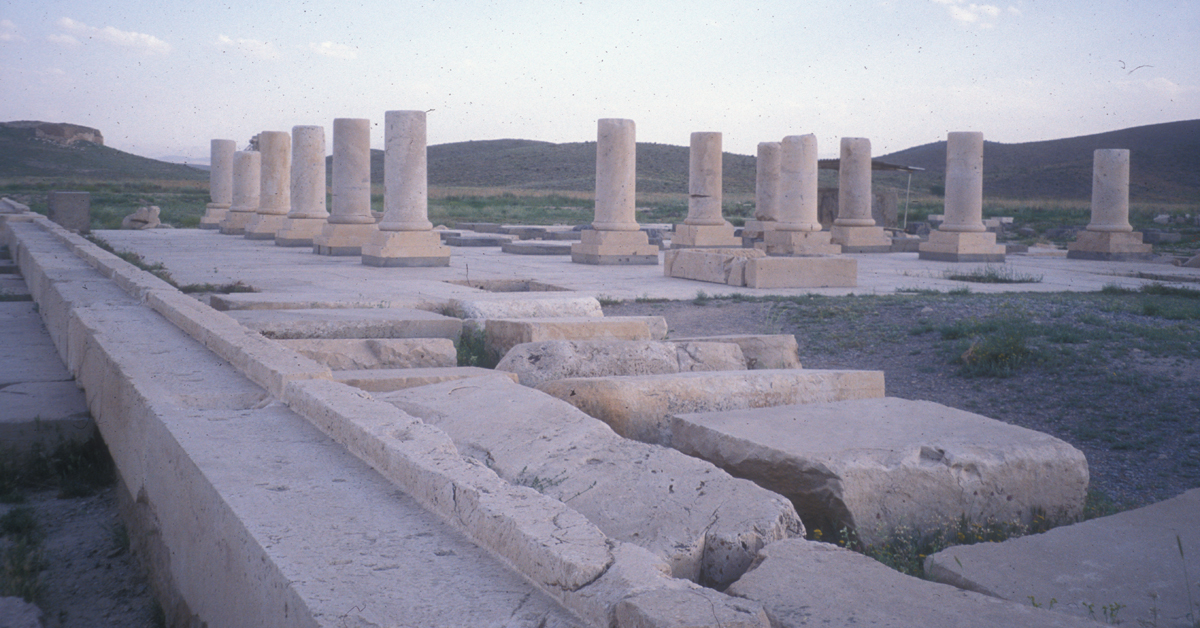
Ruins of the ancient palace of Cyrus in Pasargadae. The palace, according to Strabo, would have been built in Pasargadae as a memorial to Cyrus' victory under Astyages.

Cyrus's conquest of Media brought about a profound shift in the geopolitical situation across the Ancient Near East. Media was governed by a Persian governor, and taxes were collected as in any conquered territory. Ecbatana, due to its strategic importance in dominating Central Asia, became one of the capitals of the newly established Achaemenid Empire. The Persians adopted the Median system of state administration, which in turn contained many features of the Assyrian system. In the Achaemenid Empire, Media retained its privileged position, ranking second only to Persia itself. Part of the Median nobility maintained their privileged status under Cyrus and also under his successors. The Greeks, Jews, Egyptians, and other peoples of the ancient world often referred to the Persians as "Medes" and seemed to consider Persian history as a continuation of Median history.

According to Ctesias, Cyrus spared the life of Astyages and made him the governor of Barcania (possibly Hyrcania). Later, Astyages was taken to the desert by the eunuch Petesacas and, at the instigation of Oebares, was led to certain death. It is possible that Cyrus was not directly responsible for his death, as Petesacas was later sentenced to death, and Oebares committed suicide. If we are to believe Ctesias, Astyages had a daughter named Amytis, who was married to Spitamas, a Median noble, who thus became his son-in-law's successor. After killing Spitamas, Cyrus would have married Amytis to gain legitimacy on the Median throne. Although the authenticity of Ctesias's account is questionable, it is very likely that Cyrus married a daughter of the Median king.

The timeline of Cyrus's campaigns after the conquest of Media is not entirely clear. In the years 549-548 BCE, the Persians occupied the territories that had belonged to the defunct Median state, including Parthia, Hyrcania, and apparently Armenia. According to Xenophon (Cyropaedia I 1.4), the Hyrcanians submitted to Cyrus's sovereignty voluntarily. Ctesias (Persica IX 2–3) wrote that the Hyrcanians joined Cyrus before his victory over Astyages, while the Parthians did so after the fall of Ecbatana to the Persians. According to Justin (I 7.2), the countries that were previously subject to the Medes rebelled against Cyrus, forcing him to wage many wars to subdue them. According to Nicolaus of Damascus, after learning of Astyages's defeat, the Hyrcanians, Parthians, Sacae, Bactrians, and other nations recognized Cyrus as their king. While some scholars believe that Elam was conquered by the Persians only after 539 BCE, it is quite possible that the country was subdued around 549 BCE.

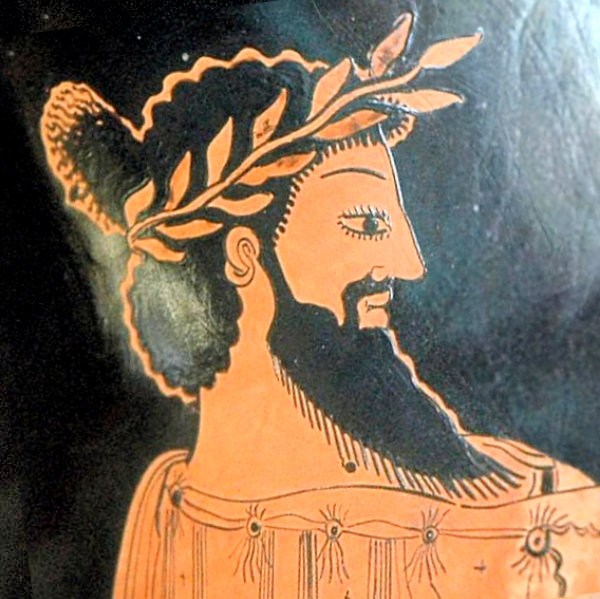
Portrait of Croesus on a Greek vase

Since 585 BCE, there was an agreement between Media and Lydia in which the Halys River served as the boundary between their domains. At the time of the fall of Media, the king of Lydia was Croesus, famous throughout the Near East and Greece for his wealth and military power. Eager to expand his domains to the east, Croesus presented the subsequent operations as an expedition intended to avenge his brother-in-law Astyages. Cyrus was a formidable opponent, so Croesus allied with the Pharaoh of Egypt, Amasis II, and the Spartans of Greece. Perhaps the Babylonian king Nabonidus also belonged to the same alliance because, despite seeing benefits in the Medo-Persian conflict, the growing power of Cyrus posed a great threat to the Neo-Babylonian Empire. The Lydians were defeated in 547 BCE, and their capital, Sardis, was besieged and captured. After conquering Lydia, Cyrus possibly conquered Cilicia, and in 539 BCE, he captured Babylon. With the conquest of the Neo-Babylonian Empire, Cyrus now became the ruler of the Levant as well. Later, Cyrus embarked on further campaigns to the east, expanding the Achaemenid Empire even more.

== Bibliography ==
=== Ancient sources ===
- The Nabonidus Chronicle of the Babylonian Chronicles
- Herodotus (Histories) I, 127
- Ctesias (Persica)
- Diodorus Siculus (Bibliotheca historica)
- Justin, Epitome of the Philippic History of Pompeius Trogus (in English)
- Fragments of Nicolaus of Damascus
- Strabo (History), (XV 3.8)

=== Modern sources ===
- Dandamayev, M.; Medvedskaya, I. (2006). "Media". Iranicaonline.org.
- Rawlinson, George (2007) [1885]. The Seven Great Monarchies of the Ancient Eastern World. Vol. 7. New York: John B. Eldan Press. ISBN 978-1-931956-46-8.
- Dandamaev, M. A. (1989). A Political History of the Achaemenid Empire. BRILL. ISBN 978-90-04-09172-6.
- Beaulieu, Paul-Alain (1989). Reign of Nabonidus, King of Babylon (556-539 BC). Yale University Press. doi:10.2307/j.ctt2250wnt. ISBN 9780300043143. JSTOR j.ctt2250wnt. OCLC 20391775.
- Ilya Gershevitch, ed., The Cambridge History of Iran. Vol. 2: The Median and Achaemenian Periods. Cambridge University Press (1985) ISBN 0-521-20091-1
- Laymon, Charles M. (1971). The Interpreter's One Volume Commentary on the Bible: Introduction and Commentary. Abingdon Press. pp. 440–442.
- Briant, Pierre (2002). From Cyrus to Alexander: A History of the Persian Empire. Eisenbrauns. ISBN 978-1-57506-120-7.
- Duncker, Max (1881). The History of Antiquity. Londres: Richard Bentley.
