= List of conflicts in the Near East =

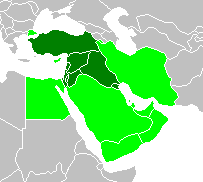
The limited, modern, archaeological, and historical context of the Near East.
The Middle and Near East.

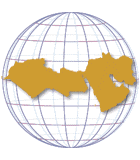
Logotype for the Bureau of Near Eastern Affairs.

Western Asia.

This is a list of conflicts in the Near East arranged chronologically from the epipaleolithic until the end of the late modern period (c. 20,000 years Before Present – c. AD 1945). The Near East is generally associated with Anatolia, the Levant, Mesopotamia, Persia, Egypt, the Arabian Peninsula, and the Caucasus.

Also listed might be any raid, strike, skirmish, siege, sacking, and/or battle (both land and naval) that occurred on the territories of a modern country occupying what may today be referred to as the "Middle East" (or the "Ancient Near East" when in reference to this region's military history during classical antiquity); however, was itself only part of an operation of a campaign in a theater of a greater, interregional war (e.g. any and/or all border, undeclared, colonial, proxy, liberation, world wars, etc.) There may also be periods of violent, civil unrest listed; such as, shootouts, spree killings, massacres, terrorist attacks, coups, assassinations, regicides, riots, rebellions, revolutions, and civil wars (as well as wars of succession and/or independence). The list might also contain episodes of human sacrifice, mass suicide, and ethnic cleansing/genocide.

== Ancient times ==
=== Bronze Age ===
==== Egypt ====
- Early Dynastic Period of Egypt
  - c. 3100 BC Unification of Upper and Lower Egypt
- Second Intermediate Period of Egypt
  - 1580–1550 BC Hyksos-Seventeenth Dynasty of Egypt wars in Lower Egypt
- New Kingdom of Egypt
    - 1550/1549–1531 BC Conquest of Hyksos-ruled Lower Egypt by Ahmose I of the Eighteenth Dynasty of Egypt
    - c.1537 BCE Ahmose I's campaigns to Syria and Nubia.
    - 16 April 1457 BCE Battle of Megiddo – a battle between Ancient Egyptian forces under the pharaoh Thutmose III and a large Canaanite coalition.
    - Battle of Kadesh, fought in May 1247 BCE between Ramses II and the Hittite Empire.

==== Mesopotamia ====
- Early Dynastic Period of Mesopotamia
  - c. 2500 BC Enmebaragesi of Kish subdued Elam
  - c. 2500 BC Aga of Kish, the son of Enmebaragesi of Kish, besieged Uruk
  - c. 2500 BC Enmerkar of Uruk's year-long siege of Aratta
  - c. 2500 BC Dumuzid of Uruk captured Enmebaragesi of Kish single-handed
  - c. 2500 BC Enshakushanna of Uruk conquered Hamazi, Akkad, Kish, and Nippur, claiming hegemony over all of Sumer. Enshakushanna was succeeded in Uruk by Lugal-kinishe-dudu, but the hegemony seems to have passed to Eannatum of Lagash for a time
  - c. 2500 BC Eannatum of Lagash conquered all of Sumer, including Ur, Nippur, Akshak, Larsa, and Uruk (controlled by Enshakushanna)
  - c. 2500 BC En-anna-tum I of Lagash succeeded his brother Eannatum and defended Lagash against Ur-Lumma of Umma
  - c. 2500 BC Entemena of Lagash succeeded his father En-anna-tum I and re-established Lagash as a power in Sumer. He defeated Illi of Umma, with the aid of Lugal-kinishe-dudu of Uruk (the successor to Enshakushanna)
  - c. 2500 BC Lugal-Anne-Mundu of Adab subjected the "Four-Quarters" of the world – i.e., the entire Fertile Crescent region, from the Mediterranean to the Zagros Mountains
  - c. 2355 BC – 2334 BC (middle chronology) Lugal-zage-si of Umma conquered several of the Sumerian city-states – including Kish, where he overthrew Ur-Zababa; Lagash, where he overthrew Urukagina; Ur, Nippur, and Larsa; as well as Uruk
- Akkadian Period
  - c. 2334 – 2270 BC Sargon of Akkad established a vast empire which is thought to have included large parts of Mesopotamia, and included parts of modern-day Iran, Asia Minor and Syria
    - Conquest of Elam
    - c. 2271 BC Battle of Uruk
    - Syria and Canaan campaigns
    - Akkadian conquest of Ebla
    - Magan revolt
    - Lullubi campaign of Naram-sin
- Gutian period
  - c. 2193 – c. 2123 BC Gutian attacks on the Akkadian Empire
  - c. 2123 BC – 2112 BC After defeating the Gutian ruler Tirigan in Sumer with the aid of other cities, Utu-hengal of Uruk established himself as the king of Sumer
- Ur III period
  - c. 2112 BC – 2094 BC (Short chronology) Ur-Nammu of Ur conquered Lagash
  - c. 2004 BC (Short chronology) Elamite Sack of Ur
- Isin-Larsa period
  - c. 1830 BC – 1817 BC (Short chronology) The Amorite chieftain Sumu-abum won independence from the city-state Kazallu
  - c. 1752 BC – 1730 BC (Short chronology) Damiq-ilishu of Isin, the last king mentioned in the Sumerian King List, is defeated by Sin-Muballit of Babylon
- Old Babylonian period
  - c. 1792 BC – 1750 BC (Short chronology) Hammurabi of Babylon extended Babylon's control over Mesopotamia by winning a series of wars against neighboring kingdoms
- Kassite dynasty
  - c. 1595 BC The Hittites sack Babylon
  - c. 1507 BC (Short chronology) Kassite attacks on Babylon

==== Levant ====
- c. 2492 BC Battle between Haik and Nimrod
- c. 2300 BC Mari-Ebla's Hundred Years War
  - c. 2300 BC Battle of Terqa
- c. 2000 BC Battle of Siddim
- c. 1900 BC Qatna-Yamhad conflict
- c. 1770 BC Yamhad kingdom conquests
- c. 1650 BC - 1600 BC Hittite-Syrian Wars
- Israelite Campaigns
  - Early Israelite campaigns
    - 1400 BC Battle of Ai (legendary)
    - Battle of Hazor (legendary)
    - Battle of Jericho (legendary)
    - Lachish
    - Battle of the Waters of Merom (legendary)
- c. 14th century BC "Syrian Wars"
- c. 1247 BC Battle of Kadesh
- c. 1012 BC-965 BC Davids wars of Conquest

==== Anatolia ====
- c. 1650 BC – 1600 BC Conquests of Hattusili I and Mursili I
- c. 1430 BC – 1350 BC Kaska invasions of Hatti

=== Early Iron Age ===
Note: This section is covering Iron Age I and II, Iron Age III is related as Classic Period

- Ancient Egypt conflicts
  - 1279 BC – 1213 BC Ramesses II campaigns in the Near East
    - First Syrian campaign
    - Second Syrian campaign
      - 1274 BC Battle of Kadesh
    - Third Syrian campaign
  - Third Intermediate Period of Egypt
    - 925 BC Sack of Jerusalem
    - 727 BC Kushite Invasion to Egypt
    - 609 BC Battle of Megiddo – a battle between the Kingdom of Egypt and the Kingdom of Judah
- Ancient Anatolia conflicts
  - 1260 BC – 1240 BC Trojan War
- Ancient Mesopotamia conflicts
  - Kassite period
    - c. 1232 BC – 1225 BC (Short chronology) Tukulti-Ninurta I of Assyria defeated Kashtiliash IV, the Kassite king of Babylon and captured the city of Babylon to ensure full Assyrian supremacy over Mesopotamia
    - c. 1157 BC – 1155 BC (Short chronology) Enlil-nadin-ahi, the final king of the Kassite dynasty that had ruled over Babylon, was defeated by Kutir-Nahhunte of Elam, the successor of Shutruk-Nakhunte
  - Fourth Babylonian Dynasty
    - c. 1125 BC – 1104 BC (Short chronology) Nebuchadnezzar I of Isin's War with Elam
- Israelite Campaigns
  - Later Israelite Campaigns
    - 1000 BC Siege of Jebus
- Assyrian campaigns
  - 853 BC Battle of Qarqar
  - 721 BC Assyrian conquest of Israel
  - Second Assyrian invasion to Southern Levant
    - 701 BC Siege of Lachish
    - 701 BC Assyrian Siege of Jerusalem by Sennacherib
  - 693 BC Battle of Diyala River (Pyrrhic Assyrian victory)
  - 693 BC Siege of Babylon
  - 626 BC Revolt of Babylon (Decisive Babylonian victory; eviction of Assyrian troops)
- Neo-Babylonian campaigns
  - 612 BC Battle of Nineveh
  - 605 BC Battle of Carchemish – a battle between the Kingdom of Egypt and Assyrian allies against the Neo-Babylonian Empire
  - Jewish–Babylonian war
    - 597 BC Siege of Jerusalem by Nebuchadnezzar II
    - 587 BC Siege of Jerusalem by Nebuchadnezzar II
- Median campaigns
  - 28 May 585 BC Battle of Halys
- Achaemenid conquests of Cyrus the Great
  - 552 BC Persian Revolt
  - 552 BC Battle of Hyrba
  - 551 BC Battle of the Persian Border
  - 550 BC Battle of Pasargadae
  - 547 BC Battle of Pteria
  - 547 BC Battle of Thymbra
  - 547 BC Siege of Sardis
  - 539 BC Battle of Opis

=== Classical antiquity ===
==== Greco-Persian domination ====
- Ionian Revolt 499–493 BC
- First Persian invasion of Greece 492–490 BC
- Egyptian Revolt 486 BC
- Second Persian invasion of Greece 480–478 BC
- Wars of Delian League 477–449 BC
- Wars of Alexander the Great
- Wars of the Diadochi 322–275 BC
- Syrian Wars 274–168 BC
  - First Syrian War (274–271 BC)
  - Second Syrian War (260–253 BC)
  - Third Syrian War (246–241 BC)
  - Fourth Syrian War (219–217 BC)
  - Fifth Syrian War (202–195 BC)
  - Sixth Syrian War (170–168 BC)
- Seleucid–Parthian wars 238–129 BC
- Roman–Syrian War 192–188 BC
- Maccabean Revolt 167–160 BC

==== Roman, Parthian and Sassanid domination ====
- Mithridatic Wars 88–63 BC
  - First Mithridatic War 88–84 BC
  - Second Mithridatic War 83–81 BC
  - Third Mithridatic War 75–63 BC
    - Hasmonean Civil War
      - Siege of Jerusalem (63 BC)
- Roman–Parthian Wars
  - Crassus invasion to Mesopotamia 53 BCE
    - Battle of Carrhae
  - Antony's Parthian War
    - Battle of Mount Gindarus
    - Siege of Jerusalem 37 BC
    - Antropatene campaign
    - Armenian campaign
  - Roman–Parthian War of 58–63 AD
  - Battle of Nisibis (217)
- Aelius Gallus campaign in Arabia 24 BC
- Alexandria pogroms 38 AD
- Jewish–Roman wars 66–136 AD
  - Great Revolt of Judea 67–70 AD
  - Kitos War 117–119 AD
  - Bar Kokhba Revolt 132–136 AD
- Roman-Sassanid Wars
  - Battle of Antioch (218)
  - Ardashir's raid of Mesopotamia 230–232 AD
  - Ardashir's second raid of Mesopotamia 237–240 AD
  - Battle of Resaena 243 AD
  - Battle of Misiche 244 AD
  - Battle of Barbalissos
  - Battle of Edessa 259
  - Siege of Singara 344
  - Siege of Amida 359
  - Battle of Ctesiphon (363)
  - Battle of Samarra 363 AD
- Uprising of Syrian Legion 232 AD
- Palmyrene revolt 272
  - Battle of Immae
  - Battle of Emesa
- Battle of Callinicum 296
- Jewish revolt against Gallus 351–352
- Isauria rebellion of 404
- Byzantine–Sasanian wars 421–628
  - Roman–Sasanian War (421–422)
  - Anastasian War (502–506)
  - Iberian War (526–532)
    - Battle of Callinicum 531
  - Roman–Persian War of 572–591
  - Byzantine–Sasanian War of 602–628
    - Antioch riots 610
    - Battle of Antioch (613)
    - Jewish revolt against Heraclius 610-28
      - Siege of Jerusalem (614)
    - Shahin's invasion of Asia Minor (615)
    - Sassanid conquest of Egypt 618–621
    - Battle of Issus
    - Byzantine assault on Persia 624-25
    - Siege of Constantinople (626)
    - Third Perso-Turkic War
    - Battle of Nineveh (627)
- Samaritan Revolts 484–573
  - Samaritan revolt against Zeno 484
  - Revolt against Anastasius I
  - Third Samaritan revolt 529–531
  - Fourth Samaritan Revolt 555–572
- Mazdak revolt in Persia 524 (or 528)
- Nika riots in Constantinople 532
- Battle of Dhi Qar – tribal rebellion in Sasanian Persia

== Medieval times ==
- Muslim conquests
  - Ridda wars 632–633
  - Muslim conquest of the Levant
    - Battle of Yarmouk 636
  - Arab conquest of Armenia
  - Muslim conquest of Egypt
  - Umayyad conquest of North Africa
  - Muslim conquest of Persia
    - First invasion of Mesopotamia
    - Second invasion of Mesopotamia
      - Battle of al-Qādisiyyah
    - Battle of Nahāvand
    - Persian Rebellion 649-51
  - Arab- Turgesh wars
    - Day of Thirst in 724
    - Battle of the Defile in 731
  - Arab–Khazar wars
- Abbasid Caliphate conflicts
  - Abbasid revolt
    - Battle of the Zab 750
  - Arab–Byzantine wars 780–1180
    - Battle of Krasos 804/5
    - Battle of Anzen 838
    - Sack of Amorium 838
    - Sack of Damietta (853)
    - Battle of Lalakaon 863
    - John Kourkouas' campaigns
      - First Melitene campaign and conquest of Kalikala 926–930
      - Second Malitene campaign 931–934
    - Sayf al-Dawla campaigns
      - Conquest of Aleppo 944
      - Battle of Marash (953)
      - Battle of Raban 958
      - Battle of Andrasos 960
      - Siege of Aleppo 962
      - Siege of Aleppo 964
  - Mudhar-Yamani conflict 793-96
- Byzantine-Paulician Wars
  - Battle of Bathys Ryax 872 (878?)
- Persian Zoroastrian Revolts 8th–9th centuries
  - Behavarid revolt in Persia 8th century
  - Babak's revolt 816-37
    - Ahmad ibn al Junayd's campaign 823-24
    - Muhammad ibn Humayd Tusi's campaign 827-29
    - Afshin's campaign 835-837/838
  - Maziar revolt 839
- Byzantine–Seljuq wars 1048–1308
  - Battle of Manzikert 1071
- Nizari Ismaili uprising in Persia and Syria
  - Nizari–Seljuk conflicts 1090–1194
- Crusades
  - People's Crusade 1095–96
  - First Crusade 1099
    - Battle of Ascalon 1099
    - Crusade of 1101
    - Battle of Ager Sanguinis 1119
    - Battle of Azaz 1125
  - Second Crusade 1145–49
    - Battle of Inab 1149
  - Baldwin's campaigns
    - Siege of Ascalon (1153)
    - Crusader invasions of Egypt 1154–69
      - Battle of al-Babein
  - Third Crusade 1189–92
    - Siege of Acre (1189–91)
  - Livonian Crusade
  - German Crusade
  - Fourth Crusade
  - Children's Crusade
  - Fifth Crusade
  - Sixth Crusade
  - Seventh Crusade
  - Shepherds' Crusade (1251)
  - Eighth Crusade
  - Ninth Crusade
  - Shepherds' Crusade (1320)
- Saladin's campaigns
  - Egyptian revolt 1169
  - Darum Siege 1170
  - Yemen conquest 1174
  - Battle of Hama 1175
  - Capture of Damascus 1174
  - Battle of Jacob's Ford 1179
  - Fight for Mosul 1182
  - Battle of Al-Fule (1183)
  - Siege of Kerak 1183
  - Battle of Cresson 1187
  - Battle of Hattin 1187
  - Siege of Jerusalem (1187)
- Mongol invasions to Middle East 13th century.
  - Battle of Köse Dağ 1243
  - Siege of Baghdad (1258)
  - Hulagu Khan's conquest of Syria 1260
    - Sack of Sidon 1260
    - Siege of Aleppo (1260)
    - Battle of Ain Jalut 1260
    - First Battle of Homs 1260
  - Battle of Elbistan 1277
  - Second Battle of Homs 1281
  - Mongol raids into Bilad al-Sham 1299–1300
    - Battle of Wadi al-Khazandar 1299
- Timur Conquests
  - Battle of Ankara (Battle of Angora) 1402
- Ottoman Interregnum 1402–1413
- Sheikh Bedreddin revolt 1416
- Byzantine–Ottoman Wars 1265–1453
  - Rise of the Ottomans 1265–1328
  - Byzantium counter: 1328–1341
    - Siege of Nicaea (1328–31)
    - Siege of Nicomedia 1333–1337
  - Balkan invasion and civil war: 1341–1371
  - Byzantine civil war and vassalage: 1371–1394
  - Resumption of hostilities: 1394–1424
  - Ottoman campaign on Constantinopolis 1424–1453

== Modern times ==
=== Early modern period ===
==== Early Ottoman expansion ====
Ottoman era period conflicts 1453–1516

- Kurdish Mokri uprising against Safavids 1506–1510
- Şahkulu Rebellion 1511

==== Conflicts involving the Ottoman empire ====
- Ottoman–Persian Wars 16th–19th centuries
  - Battle of Chaldiran 1514
  - Ottoman–Safavid War (1532–55)
  - Ottoman–Safavid War (1578–90)
  - Ottoman–Safavid War (1603–18)
    - Battle of DimDim 1609–10
  - Ottoman–Safavid War (1623–39)
    - Abaza rebellion
  - Ottoman–Persian War (1730–35)
  - Ottoman–Persian War (1743–1746)
  - Ottoman–Persian War (1775–1776)
  - Ottoman–Persian War (1821–1823)
- Jelali revolts 1519–1659
- Conflicts between the Ottomans and the Druze of Mount Lebanon
  - 1585 Ottoman expedition against the Druze
  - Battle of Majdel Anjar 1622
  - 1633 conflict
  - 1642 conflict
  - 1660 conflict
  - 1683–1699 conflict
  - Battle of Ain Dara 1711
- Cretan War (1645–69)
  - Atmeydanı Incident
  - Çınar Incident 1656

=== Late modern period ===
==== Conflicts involving the Ottoman empire ====
- Edirne revolt 1703
- 1717 Omani invasion of Bahrain
- Patrona Halil uprising 1730
- Zahir al-Umar Revolt (Galilee) 1742–1743
- Ali Bey Al-Kabir Revolt (Egypt) 1769–1772
- Bajalan uprising 1775
- French campaign in Egypt and Syria 1798–1801
  - Cairo revolt 1798
  - Battle of the Nile
  - Siege of Jaffa
  - Battle of Mount Tabor (1799)
  - Siege of Acre (1799)
- Baban uprising 1806–1808
- Ottoman coups of 1807–08
  - Kabakçı Mustafa revolt
- Muhammad Ali's campaigns
  - Muhammad Ali's seizure of power 1803–07
  - Fraser campaign (1807)
  - Ottoman–Saudi War 1811–18
  - Egyptian–Ottoman War (1831–33)
  - Syrian Peasant revolts
    - Palestine and Transjordan revolt 1834
    - Alawite revolt (1834–35)
  - 1838 Druze revolt
  - Egyptian–Ottoman War (1839–41)
- Russo-Persian War (1826–28)
- Cizre uprising 1829
- Atçalı Kel Mehmet revolt 1829–30
- Prince Mohammad of Soran uprising 1833
- Yezidi uprising 1837
- Sîncar uprising 1837

==== Ottoman Tanzimat period ====
- First Botan uprising 1843
- Bedr Khan Bey uprising 1843
- Culemerg uprising 1843
- Bedirhan Bey uprising 1847
- Massacre of Aleppo (1850)
- Yezdan Sher uprising 1855
- 1860 Druze–Maronite conflict
  - French expedition in Syria 1860–61
- Qatari–Bahraini War 1867–68
- Russo-Turkish War (1877–78)
- Urabi Revolt (Egypt) 1879–82
- Shaykh 'Ubaydullah of Nehri and Shemdinan uprising 1880–1881
- Royal Civil War in Arabia 1887–91
  - Battle of Mulayda 1891
- 1892 Tobacco Rebellion (Iran)
- Hamidian massacres 1894–96
  - Zeitun Rebellion (1895–96)
- Unification of Saudi Arabia
  - Saudi–Rashidi War 1903–06
- Persian Constitutional Revolution 1908–09
- Young Turk Revolution 1908–09
  - 31 March Incident 1909
- Adana massacre 1909
- Hauran Druze Rebellion 1909
- Zaraniq rebellion 1909–1910 (c. 830+ fatalities)
- 1913 Ottoman coup d'état
- Middle Eastern theatre of World War I 1914–1918
  - Sinai and Palestine Campaign
  - Mesopotamian campaign
  - Caucasus Campaign
  - Persian Campaign
  - Gallipoli Campaign
  - Arab Revolt
  - Armenian genocide
  - Assyrian genocide
  - 1st Dersim rebellion

== See also ==
- Conflicts in the Horn of Africa
- List of conflicts in Africa
- List of conflicts in Asia
- List of conflicts in Central America
- List of conflicts in Europe
- List of conflicts in North America
- List of conflicts in South America
- List of modern conflicts in North Africa
