= Battle of Hyrba =

Battle during the Medo-Persian conflict (552 BC)

- Part of the Medo-Persian conflict
Date	Winter–Spring?, 552 BC
Location	Hyrba
Result	Persian victory
Territorial changes	Allies of northern Media defect to Persia

Belligerents
Median Kingdom	Persis

Commanders and leaders
Harpagos (early); Unknown others	Kyros II; Harpagos (late); Unknown others

Strength
300 cavalry	5,000 infantry, (engaged)? 1,000+ cavalry

Casualties and losses
250 cavalry	Very light

The Battle of Hyrba was the first battle between the Persians and Medians, taking place around 552 BC. It was also the first battle after the Persians had revolted. These actions were led (for the most part) by Cyrus the Great, as he shifted the powers of the ancient Near East. The Persian success in the battle led to the creation of Persia's first empire and began Cyrus' decade long conquest of almost all of the known world. Though the only authority with a detailed account of the battle was Nicolaus of Damascus, other well-known historians such as Herodotus, Ctesias, and Strabo also mention the battle in their own accounts.

The outcome of the battle was such a great blow to the Medes that Astyages decided to personally invade Persia. The hasty invasion eventually led to his downfall. In turn, the former enemies of the Medes tried to move against them, only to be stopped by Cyrus. Thus a period of reconciliation began, which facilitated a close relationship between the Persians and Medes, and enabled Ecbatana, capital of Media, to pass to the Persians as one of Persia's capitals in the newly formed empire.

== Background ==
The battle occurred after the Persian Revolt, which is known to have taken place in the summer of 553 BC. Based on scant sources the battle (which was in Hyrba) is believed to have taken place at least half a year after the revolt had already begun, probably in the beginning of winter in 552 BC. Astyages, the king of Medes, who is thought to have also been Cyrus's grandfather, had earlier turned down the request of Cyrus to leave his court and visit his parents again, as he had done several times earlier. Though his request to Astyages was not unusual, Cyrus had made the mistake of asking him right after the revolt that had happened, but through the pleading of the Persian servant, Oebares, Astyages let him visit his parents again. In Herodotus' version, in one of the first times Cyrus had gone to his parents, the Median general Harpagus had secretly sent a letter stuffed in a hare to Cyrus to plot a revolt, and Cyrus passed the letter on to his father. This matches the account of Nicolaus in which he says that Cambyses I had already assembled many troops well before the battle had started, and that he later despatched a small number to Cyrus's aid. Cyrus sent a message to his father saying "... send at once 1000 cavalry and 5000 foot-soldiers to the city of Hyrba which lay on the way, and to arm the rest of the Persians as quickly as possible in such a way that it should seem to be done by command of the king. His true aims he did not communicate to him." This also confirms the notion that the battle took place months, not days, after the revolt. Astyages' decision to let Cyrus return to his parents is considered by some to have changed history by eventually enabling the Persis province to become the most powerful state in the ancient world.

== Motives ==
Cyrus was in Ecbatana when the revolt had already begun. In Nicolaus's account, when Cyrus was let go, he fled from Astyages because he knew he might eventually be executed if Astyages discovered that Cyrus's true motive was to join and fight alongside his father, if necessary. This is because when Cyrus was halfway to becoming an adult he learned that Astyages had already tried to execute him when he was an infant, but it did not succeed, and as time passed, Astyages came to respect Cyrus for the similarities of character they shared. Meanwhile, Astyages was not sure if it was safe to let Cyrus return to his homeland. Astyages eventually did, and it helped terminate the Median kingdom. When Astyages was tricked by Harpagus twice into believing Cyrus was not a danger to him, even when the revolt and impending signs of danger had already happened, Cyrus saw how easily Astyages could be swindled. For this reason, Cyrus may have taken advantage of this to bring freedom to his own kingdom.

When Cyrus was again with Astyages, Oebares reminded him of his advice. Cyrus followed it, sent to Persia, and when he found that all was ready, asked Astyages, under the pretext that Oebares had suggested, for permission to go to Persia. The king would not let him go. Then Cyrus betook himself to the most trustworthy of the eunuchs; when a favorable moment came, he was to obtain permission for the journey to Persia. One day, when Cyrus found the king in the best of humors and cheered with wine, he gave the eunuch a sign, and the latter said to the king: 'Cyrus asks to perform the sacrifice, which he has vowed for thee in Persia, that thou mightest continue gracious to him, and for permission to visit his sick father.' The king called for Cyrus, and with a smile, gave him permission of absence for five months; in the sixth month, he was to return. Cyrus bowed in gratitude before the king appointed Tiridates as butler to the king during his absence, and on the next he set out to Persia.

— Nicholaus' Fragments

Meanwhile, Astyages invited the best singer of the Medes, and the last song played by the professional minstrel that was also a Magus, named Angares, which was also accompanied by a girl, disturbed Astyages deeply.

A fierce wild beast,
more fierce than any boar,
was let go,
and sent into a sunny country and he should reign over all these provinces and should,
with a handful of men,

maintain war against large armies.

She related this to her husband, who at once went to Astyages, told him all and added that Cyrus had obviously gone to Persia with a view of preparing for the execution of that which the dream had portended. The king was seized with great anxiety, and the Babylonian advised him to put Cyrus to death as soon as he returned.

— Nicolaus' Fragments

Astyages tried to call Cyrus back again, but could not get him.

== Battle ==
Astyages applied this song to himself and Cyrus, and on the spot sent 300 horsemen to bring him back; if he would not obey they were to cut off his head and bring that. When the horsemen brought to Cyrus the commands of Astyages, he answered cunningly, perhaps on the advice of Oebares: 'Why should I not return as my lord summons me? Today we will feast; tomorrow morning we will set out.' This met with their approval. After the manner of the Persians, Cyrus caused many oxen and other animals to be slain in sacrifice, feasted the horsemen, and made them intoxicated; at the same time he sent a message to his father to send at once 1,000 cavalry and 5,000 foot soldiers to the city of Hyrba which lay on the way, and to arm the rest of the Persians as quickly as possible in such a way that it should seem to be done by command of the king. His true aims he did not communicate to him. In the night he and Oebares took horse, just as they were, hastened to Hyrba, armed the inhabitants, and drew out those whom Atradates had sent in order for battle. When the horsemen of Astyages had slept off their debauch on the following morning, and found that Cyrus had disappeared, they pursued him and went to Hyrba. Here Cyrus first displayed his bravery, for with his Persians he slew 250 of the horse of Astyages. The remainder escaped, and brought the news to Astyages.

— Nicolaus' Fragments

Concerning the troops types, it is unknown whether or not the Persian infantry engaged in the battle. It is most likely Cyrus and the cavalry he had escaped with from Media fought directly with the Median cavalry Astyages had sent to bring Cyrus back. Cyrus might have known he needed all his men when fighting Astyages's best cavalry, for when battle had started, Cyrus with his will and superior numbers had the advantage. Nicolas goes as far as to say Cyrus first displayed his bravery in this battle. Nevertheless, Cyrus's tactics proved successful in maintaining the war. In Herodotus' Histories, he hints the first battle between the Persians and Medes, which Harpagus goes over to Cyrus, and most of the Medes either joined Cyrus or were killed, with a small force escaping back to Media. This seems to go in accordance with Nicolaus' account of the first battle.

== Aftermath ==
'Woe is me!' cried the king striking his thigh, 'That I, well knowing that we should not do good to the evil, have allowed myself to be carried away by clever speeches, and have raised up this Mardian to be such a mischief to me. Still, he shall not succeed.'

— Nicolaus' Fragments

While Cambyses met with his son and organized the 350,000+ men, Astyages armed men under and over age for fighting battles, and from all over the empire, to come. Purportedly with 1,205,000+ men, Astyages marched his troops out. Most historians consider this number fantastic, but others consider it as part of the reserves. This is because in the battles to come, no more than 200,000 men from either side would actually take to the field. When Astyages knew he had underestimated Cyrus, he knew putting down a revolt was not enough, but a massive invasion had to be carried out, so the invasion of Persia by Astyages began.

== Historical assessment ==
The battle was the first major blow to the Medes, as this was the first time in a long time that Media had been defeated in a battle. As Cyrus's first victory in the war, it did not go well with Astyages, the king of the Medes. It also caused the northern satraps to revolt, and ally their provinces with Persia. Years after the war, the Persians and Medes still held a deep appreciation of one another, and some Medes were allowed to become part of the Persian Immortals. Since the early 1900s this battle was almost forgotten to history. As most of its account comes from fragments, only in the later modern age historians have renewed interest in this (now considered) historic event which changed the ancient world. This is because the battle started a chain reaction of events which led Persia to become the most powerful state for the next quarter of a millennium.

== See also ==
- Battle of the Persian Border

== Bibliography ==
=== Classical sources ===
- The Nabonidus Chronicle of the Babylonian Chronicles
- Herodotus (The Histories) I, 127-128
- Ctesias (Persica)?
- Justin, Epitome of the Philippic History of Pompeius Trogus I, 6 (in English)
- Fragments of Nicolaus of Damascus
- Strabo (History) XV, 3.8
- Athenaeus (Deipnosophistae), 1.14 (633e) 6:419 (Quotes)

=== Modern sources ===
- Rawlinson, George (1885). The Seven Great Monarchies of the Eastern World, New York, John B. Eldan Press, reprint (2007) p. 120-121. In 4 volumes. ISBN 978-1-4286-4792-3
- Fischer, W.B., Ilya Gershevitch, and Ehsan Yarshster, The Cambridge History of Iran, Cambridge University Press (1993) p. 145. In 1 volume. ISBN 0-521-20091-1
- Stearns, Peter N., and Langer, William L. (2004). The Encyclopedia of World History: Ancient, Medieval, and Modern, Chronologically Arranged, Boston, Houghton Mifflin Press, (2001) p. 40. In 6 editions. ISBN 0-395-65237-5
