= Battle of the Persian Border =

Battle during the Medo-Persian conflict (551 BC?)

- Part of the Medo-Persian conflict
Date	551 BC?
Location	On the road between Ecbatana and Pasargadae, on the Persian side of the border between Media and Persis
Result	Persian victory

Belligerents
Median Kingdom	Persis

Commanders and leaders
Astyages; Unknown others	Kambyses I (WIA); Kyros II; Oebares; Unknown others

Strength
60,000 cavalry 3,000 chariots	50,000 cavalry 100 chariots Unknown amount of peasants defending the city walls

Casualties and losses
Heavy	Light

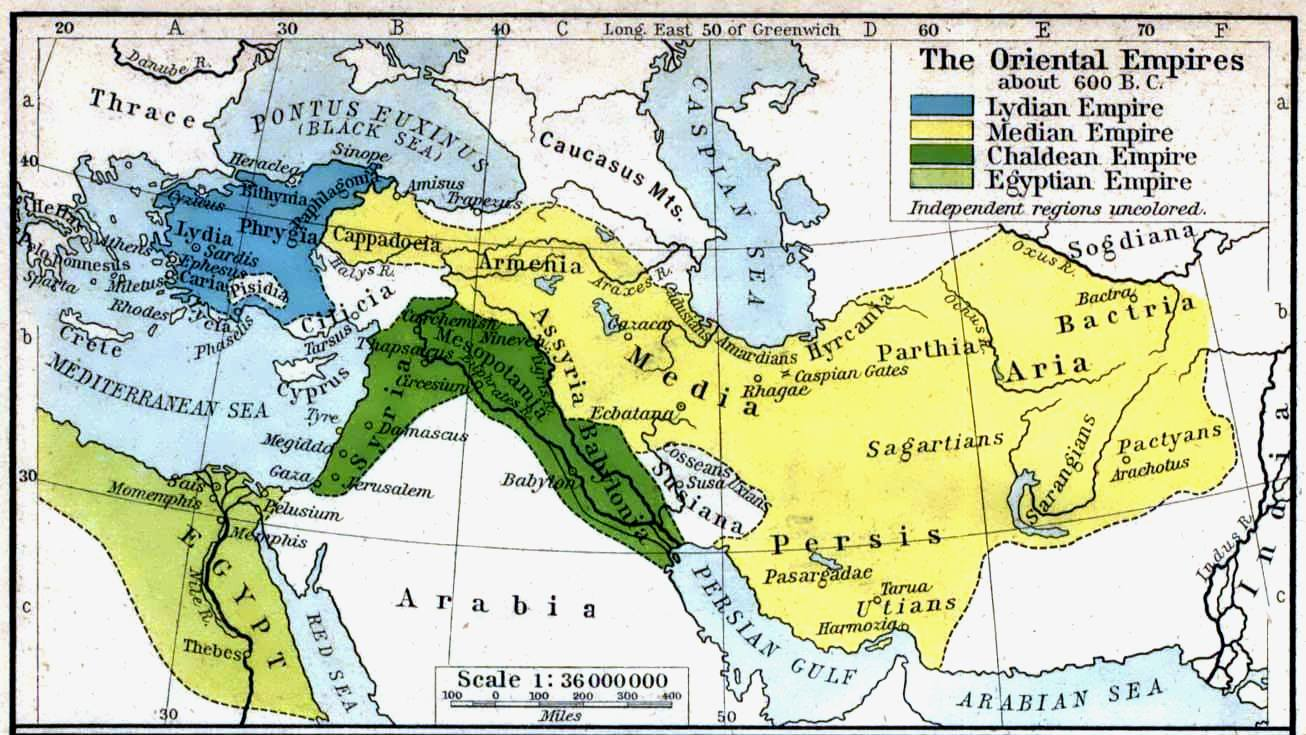
Median Empire, about 600 B.C.

The Battle of the Persian Border was the second encounter between the forces of Media and Persia. Though not a decisive victory for Persia, it signaled the diminishing power of Media in southwest Asia. It was the first battle Cambyses I had fought in, and the first which he had fought with his son, Cyrus the Great. The first major battle, which lasted two days, was an attempt to bring freedom to Persia. It also prompted the Persians to retire south and fight a third battle.

It was narrated by Nicolaus of Damascus, who also mentioned the Battle of Hyrba, but Herodotus does not. Most historians on the battle consider Herodotus to be saying only the first and last battles in the war, which is partly based on the description of his two battles. This became the first major battle between the two powers at the border. Cyrus managed to escape the enemy without retreating, thus ending the battle and prolonging the struggle without a complete victory for Astyages, the king of the Medes. The next battle, the Battle of Pasargadae, became the last stand for the Persians, as their very existence relied on the outcome.

== Background ==
Cyrus had retired to the border of the Median province to protect the Persian border against Astyages. After the Battle of Hyrba, Astyages invaded Persia. The battle that was to come was composed of cavalry from both sides, and chariots that in most part were used for the battle, for they were never used again. A small part of the invasion force from the Medes participated in the battle, while the Persians spent all their cavalry from their reserves. Astyages had tried to persuade Cyrus to surrender, but he now preferred to show no mercy even though he had better relations with Atradates (the variant name of Herodotus' Mitradates, which Nicolaus mistakenly uses for Cambyses, the father of Cyrus). The name of the city that Cyrus and his father were protecting was not given. Nevertheless, the city was an important frontier town worth protecting. When Astyages came within reach of the city, Persian civilians were ready to evacuate if necessary. Meanwhile, Cyrus and Cambyses assembled the army, but it is not exactly known whether Oebares (who helped Cyrus to the throne) or Harpagus participated on the side of Cyrus in the battle, it is known that the original Oebares was an advisor to Cyrus. So Nicolaus, as he is known to change names around, may most likely be saying Harpagus was in the battle, as he was historically Cyrus's second in command and the only other choice available. Still, in this battle, it seems Oebares was on Cyrus's side. Then it could also be said, as Herodotus mentions, that Harpagus was the most likely candidate in this battle that occurred about a year after the first battle. Therefore, Astyages had his special troops positioned to attack at the rear as battle began.

== Motives ==
Cyrus encouraged the Persians, and Oebares seized the passes of the mountain and the heights, built lines, and brought the people from the open cities into such as were well fortified. Astyages burned down the abandoned cities, summoned Atradates and Cyrus to submission, and taunted them with their former beggary. Cyrus replied that Astyages did not recognize the power of the gods, which forced them, goat-herds as they were, to accomplish what was destined to be done. As he had done them kindness, they bade him lead back the Medes, and give their freedom to the Persians, who were better than the Medes.

— Nicolaus' Fragments

== Battle ==
Thus it came to a battle. Astyages, surrounded by 20,000 of his bodyguard, looked on: among the Persians, Atradates had the right, and Oebares the left wing, Cyrus, surrounded by the bravest warriors, was in the center. The Persians defended themselves bravely, and slew many of the Medes, so Astyages cried out on his throne: 'How bravely these "terebinth-eaters" fight!' But at length the Persians were overpowered by numbers and driven into the city before which they fought. Cyrus and Oebares advised to send the women and children to Pasargadae, which is the loftiest mountain, and renew the battle the following day: 'If we are defeated, we must all die, and if that must be so, it is better to fall in victory and for the freedom of our country.' Then all were filled with hatred and anger against the Medes, and when the morning came and the gates were opened, all marched out; Atradates alone remained with the old men in the city to defend the walls. But while Cyrus and Oebares were fighting in the field, Astyages caused 100,000 men to go round and attack the Persian army in the rear. The attack succeeded. Atradates fell, covered with wounds, into the hands of the Medes. Astyages said to him: 'An excellent satrap are you; is it thus that you thank me, you and your son, for what I have done for you?' Atradates, almost at the last gasp, replied: 'I know not, O king, what deity has roused this frenzy in my son; put me not to the torture, I shall soon die.' Astyages had compassion on him and said: 'I will not put you to the torture; I know that if your son had followed your advice, he would not have done such things.' Atradates died, and Astyages gave him an honorable burial.

— Nicolaus' Fragments

== Aftermath ==
After the first day's battle, the Persians had inflicted massive casualties on Astyages' personal guard, that was made up of cavalry, and the rest of his army, that was also cavalry. Nevertheless, the Persians still claimed victory on the first day. The second day of the battle, Cyrus, assuming the battle had ended, secretly retired south with the rest of the armed forces, while only Cambyses and a few old men remained in the city. When Cyrus was forced to fight again, Astyages' ingenious move of cavalry occurred, which was aimed at capturing the poorly guarded city. As he assumed the battle had not ended, he easily captured the city, while only Cambyses was reportedly wounded and later died. It is debated among today's historians whether the second day should be counted as part of the original battle, or it should be counted as a separate battle. As the Persians retired south, Astyages readily abandoned the city, which is based partly on the scant sources from Nicolaus, therefore not becoming a complete victory for Astyages, as he is not known to put a garrison there after he and his forces went south after the Persians. It was, however, a psychological blow to the Medes as they thought the Persians were lucky in the first battle, but again the Persians won, this time tactically. Both armies later returned to their camps and organized their armies while deciding where to meet for the next fight. Then, as the year passed, both forces agreed to meet at the Persian capital, which Astyages wished to capture.

Meanwhile, Cyrus and Oebares, after a brave struggle, had been compelled to retire to Pasargadae.

— Nicolaus' Fragments

== Bibliography ==
=== Classical sources ===
- Ctesias (Persica)
- Fragments of Nicolaus of Damascus

=== Modern sources ===
- Rawlinson, George (1885).The Seven Great Monarchies of the Eastern World, New York, John B. Eldan Press, reprint (2007) p. 120-121. In 4 volumes. ISBN 978-1-4286-4792-3
- Fischer, W.B., Ilya Gershevitch, and Ehsan Yarshster, The Cambridge History of Iran, Cambridge University Press (1993) p. 145. In 1 volume. ISBN 0-521-20091-1
- Stearns, Peter N., and Langer, William L. (2004).The Encyclopedia of World History: Ancient, Medieval, and Modern, Chronologically Arranged, Boston, Houghton Mifflin Press, (2001) p. 40. In 6 editions. ISBN 0-395-65237-5
