= Hyrba =

Hyrba, a Median city, was one of only a few large Median cities known to exist. Probably built before the beginning of Median accession to power, it was likely a royal city of the kings. Even though it has not been found to this day, it is still considered to have existed. Hyrba appears as a Persian town on the borders of Media in a fragment of Nicolaus of Damascus. Though in Nicolaus's account he comments on its location being in Media, therefore it is still considered a mystery.

Ongoing research into its exact location has not proven any verifiable results. Historians consider Hyrba like other lost Median cities, which it is impossible to locate unless by the merest conjecture. The first battle known to have taken place there was the first battle between Media and Persia and was fought between Harpagus and Cyrus the Great. According to Ctesias, Cyrus defeated the Median forces near the town of Hyrba (the location of which remains unknown). Therefore, it can be said that it was an important city near the frontier towns between Media and Persia, though on which side it is unknown, but likely in the Median province.

== See also ==
- Battle of Hyrba
