= Persica =

Persica may refer to:

- Persica (Ctesias), a lost ancient Greek text
- Persica (section), a section of Prunus
