= Patricia O'Grady =

Australian historian of philosophy

Patricia F. O'Grady is an Australian historian of philosophy specializing in ancient Greek philosophy and in particular on Thales of Miletus. She earned a doctorate in 1998 at Flinders University, with the dissertation Thales: Some Problems in Early Greek Science and Philosophy.

Her books include:

- Thales of Miletus: The Beginnings of Western Science and Philosophy (Ashgate, 2002)
- Meet the Philosophers of Ancient Greece: Everything You Always Wanted to Know about Ancient Greek Philosophy But Didn't Know who to Ask (edited, Ashgate, 2005)
- The Sophists: An Introduction (edited, Bloomsbury, 2008)

She was the author of the first book to cover Thales, although another has subsequently appeared. Some of her claims about Thales have been controversial. One of these concerns Thales' prediction of the eclipse of Thales in May 585 BCE. Following Bartel Leendert van der Waerden, O'Grady suggested that Thales could have predicted this solar eclipse through its occurrence 23 1/2 months after a lunar eclipse, using Mesopotamian data on prior eclipses. However, although David Sherry finds this theory convincing, it has been disputed by Dirk L. Couprie, who argued against the possibility of making the prediction in this way and provided an alternative theory. Another of these claims concerns a passage in Aristotle stating that Thales described the Earth as floating on water. The consensus of scholars is that Thales thought that the world was flat, and floats like a leaf or a raft on a flat ocean, but O'Grady takes the non-standard and disputed position that Thales thought of the Earth as a sphere surrounded by space, with its land masses ("earth", using the same word as Earth in ancient Greek as one does in English) floating on its oceans, and that Thales was misinterpreted by Aristotle.
