= Labinetus =

Labinetus or Labynetus (Ancient Greek: Λαβύνητος, romanized: Labýnētos; Hellenized form of the Akkadian name Nabû-naʾid) is a name that probably refers to the kings of the Chaldean dynasty (626-539 BCE) in general. The Hellenized form of the name occurs only in Herodotus' Histories.

According to the Greek historian Herodotus (5th century BCE), Syennesis I of Cilicia and Labynetus of Babylon negotiated a peace treaty between the king Alyattes of Lydia and the king Cyaxares of Media.

War broke out between the two countries and continued for five years, during which both the Lydians and the Medes won several victories. On one occasion they fought an unexpected battle in the dark, an event that occurred after five years of indecisive warfare. The two armies had already faced each other and the fight was in progress, when the day suddenly turned into night.[...] Both the Lydians and the Medes broke off the war when they saw the darkening of the day; they were more anxious than before to conclude peace, and a reconciliation was effected by Syennesis, a Cilician, and Labynetus of Babylon, who were the men responsible both for the peace pact and for the exchange of marriages between the two kingdoms. They persuaded Alyattes to give his daughter Aryenis to Astyages, son of Cyaxares - knowing that treaties rarely remain intact without powerful sanctions.

Labynetus is believed to be Herodotus' way of writing Nabonidus' name. Therefore, it is likely that Labynetus was the later king of the Babylonian Empire, Nabonidus (r. 556-539 BCE). The solar eclipse can be dated to May 28, 585 BCE. It is also possible that the Labynetus mentioned by Herodotus is identical with Nebuchadnezzar II. This is far from certain, but it is likely that the Babylonians, who had now conquered the west, were interested in Anatolia, where iron was to be obtained. At the same time, Nebuchadnezzar appears to have had more or less friendly relations with the mountain tribes.
