= Syennesis =

Syennesis (Ancient Greek: Συέννεσις) was the name of a number of men in classical antiquity. In particular it seems to have been a common name of the native kings of Cilicia.

- Syennesis (5th century), a figure in the conflict of Artaxerxes II of Persia and Cyrus the Younger
- Syennesis of Cyprus, an ancient Greek physician in the 4th century BCE
- Syennesis, a contemporary with Achaemenid Empire king Darius I, to whom he was tributary
- Syennesis, a king of Cilicia, who joined with Labynetus (Nebuchadnezzar) in mediating between Cyaxares and Alyattes of Lydia, the kings respectively of Media and Lydia
