= Zaraniq rebellion (1909–1910) =

Revolt in Yemen, Ottoman Empire

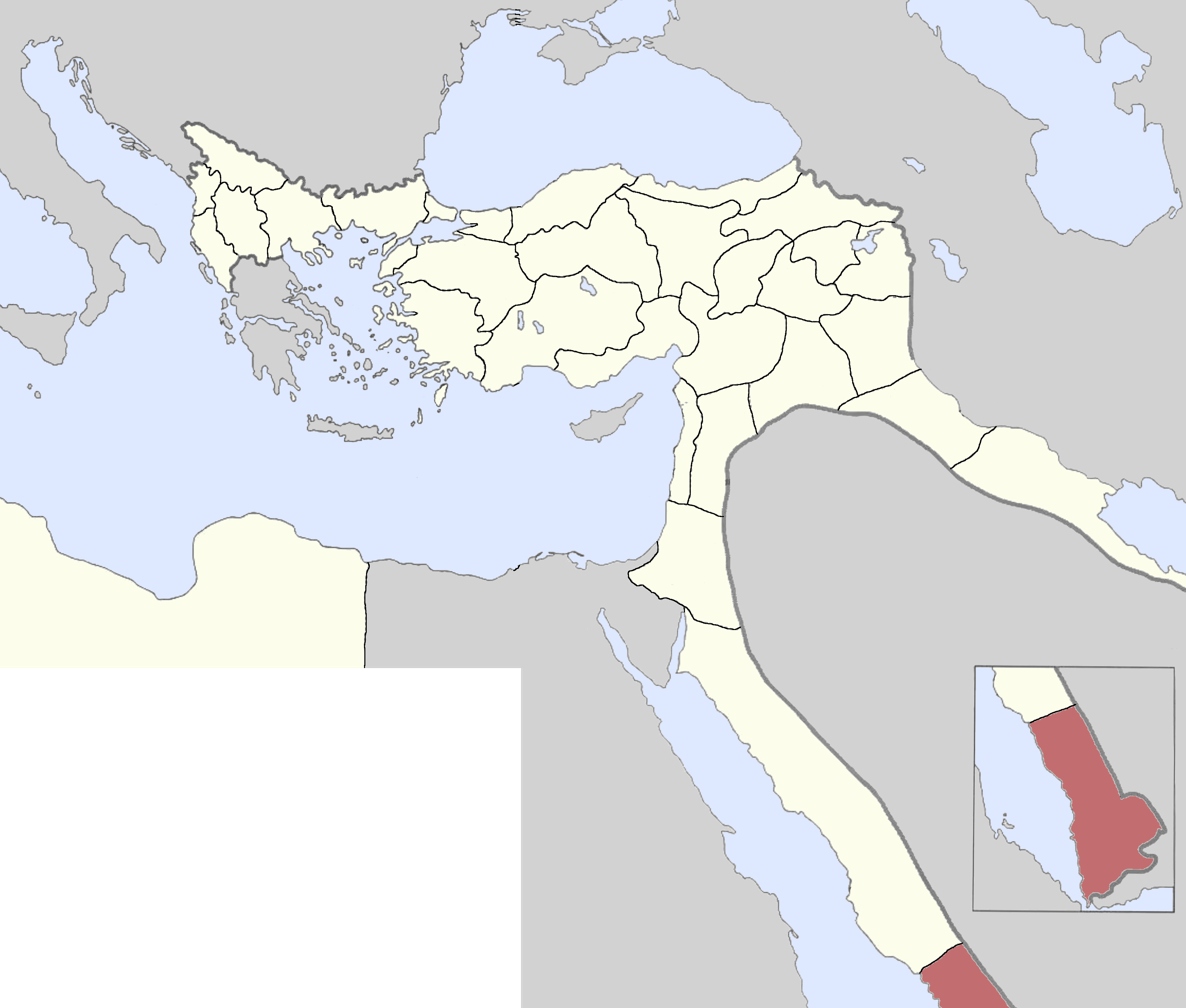
- Yemen Vilayet in 1900
Date	18 February 1909 – February 1910
Location	Yemen Vilayet
Result	Ottoman victory

Belligerents
Ottoman Empire	Zaraniq tribesmen

Commanders and leaders
(Ottoman Empire) Recip Beg (Ottoman Empire) Hacip Paşa (Ottoman Empire) Ferik Yusuf Paşa	Kaymakam Mahmud Riza (POW)

Strength
Initially: 1,500 to 1,600 troops 2 mountain guns Reinforcements: 3 battalions	10,000

The Zaraniq rebellion was a rebellion of the Zaraniq Tribe that took place between 1909 and 1910 in the Yemen Vilayet, which was then part of the Ottoman Empire.

The rebellion was fought for two reasons: Opposition to the extension of telegraph lines through their territory, and the unmet demand that the sons of their leaders held hostage in Hodeida, Bayt al-Faqih and other localities be released from prison.

The uprising began in February 1909. In response, an Ottoman Force advancing from Zabid captured a Zaraniq stronghold nearby Husayniyah, but was ambushed on 23 February near Beit-el-fakih after when it tried to link up with another Ottoman Force to the south. On 7 March, the Ottomans defeated the Zaraniq near Husayniyah, killing 80. Upon receiving reinforcements, the Ottomans renewed the offensive, but the fighting was inconclusive. In February 1910, the Ottomans ambushed a Zaraniq force, killing 750. The Ottomans refused to offer the Zaraniq amnesty until they disarmed; it's unclear if this offer was accepted.
