= Amytis (daughter of Astyages) =

Royal woman in ancient Persia

- Born: Ecbatana
- Died: c. 520s BCE; Pasargadae
- Spouse: Spitamas; Cyrus the Great
- Median: *ᴴumati
- Old Persian: *ᴴumati
- House: Median
- Father: Astyages
- Mother: Aryenis (?)
- Religion: Ancient Iranian religion

Amytis (c. 540s-c. 520s BCE; Median: *ᴴumati; Ancient Greek: Αμυτις Amutis; Latin: Amytis) was an Achaemenid queen consort. She was the daughter of the Median king Astyages, and the wife of Cyrus II.

== Name ==
The female name Amytis is the Latinised form of the Greek name Amutis (Αμυτις), which perhaps may reflect (with vowel metathesis) an Median and Persian *ᴴumati, meaning "having good thought," and which is an equivalent of the Avestan term humaⁱti (𐬵𐬎𐬨𐬀𐬌𐬙𐬌).

== Life ==
Amytis was the daughter of the Median king Astyages. Amytis had a paternal aunt, also named Amytis, who was the sister of Astyages and was married to the king Nebuchadnezzar II of Babylon.

Amytis was married to Spitamas, who was a Median grandee and the prospective successor of Astyages.

After Astyages was overthrown by the Persian king Cyrus, who was his own grandson through his daughter Mandane, and therefore was the nephew of Amytis, Cyrus killed Spitamas and married Amytis to legitimise his rule.

After the murder of Tanyoxarces, Amytis demanded the extradition of his murder from Cyrus's son and successor, Cambyses II. When her demands were not met, she committed suicide by drinking poison.

== Sources ==
- Schmitt, R. (1989). "AMYTIS". Encyclopædia Iranica.
