= Persica (Ctesias) =

Ancient Greek text

Persica (/pεrsɪkɑː/; Ancient Greek: Περσικά, Persiká) is a lost Ancient Greek text, divided in 23 books, on Assyrian, Median and Persian history written by Ctesias of Cnidus, a physician at the court of the Persian king Artaxerxes II (404–358 BC). The work's style and value for the study of the Achaemenid history have been a subject of much controversy among modern scholars.

== Outline of the work ==
Books 1–3: Assyrian history. The books described the reign of the legendary king Ninus who founded the Assyrian empire and the city of Nineveh, and conquered large parts of western Asia; the reign of the legendary Queen Semiramis and her invasion of India; the reigns of Ninyas and of Sardanapalus and the end of the Assyrian empire after the revolts of Arbaces of Media and Belesys of Babylon.

Books 4–6: Median history. The books recounted the history of the Median empire from the reign of Arbaces to the reign of Astyages and his defeat in the hands of Cyrus the Great of Persia. Books 1–6 may have originally been conceived as a separate work devoted to Assyriaca and Medica, and opposed to the rest of the work devoted to the Persian history.

Books 7–11: Cyrus the Great (600–530 BC). The books described Cyrus' rise from humble origins, his conquest of the Median empire and his reign down to his death.

Books 12–15: The reigns of Cambyses (530–522 BC), Darius the Great (522–486 BC) and Xerxes I (486–465 BC).

Books 16–17: The reign of Artaxerxes I (465–424 BC), including Inarus' revolt in Egypt (460–455 BC) and Megabyzus' revolt.

Books 18: The reigns of Xerxes II (424 BC), Sogdianus (424 BC) and Darius II Ochus (423–405/4 BC), including the machinations of his wife, Queen Parysatis.

Books 19–23: The reign of Artaxerxes II down to 398 BC, including the revolt of Cyrus the Younger and his death at the battle of Cunaxa (401 BC), the machinations of the Queen Mother Parysatis (who had the murderers of Cyrus the Younger tortured and executed and who poisoned the King's favourite wife Stateira), and Ctesias' role as negotiator (with Conon of Athens). The work seems to have concluded with a list of kings from Ninus and Semiramis down to Artaxerxes II.

== The textual tradition of Ctesias' Persica ==
Ctesias' Persica has not been preserved through a manuscript tradition. The knowledge of it is derived through a single papyrus fragment containing 29 lines of text (POxy 2330) and references in later ancient authors, most importantly Diodorus Siculus, Nicolaus of Damascus, Dionysius of Halicarnassus, Plutarch, Claudius Aelianus, Athenaeus and the Byzantine bishop Photius. A vast majority of the later references refers to Persica rather than citing them verbatim, thus not allowing us a direct access to Ctesias' own words.

The most important editions of the fragments of the Persica up to date include:

- Felix Jacoby 1958: Die Fragmente der griechischen Historiker, Teil 3c (Autoren über einzelne Länder), Nr. 688;
- König, F. W 1972: Die Persika von Ktesias von Knidos. Graz: Selbstverlag des Herausgebers.
- Lenfant, Dominique 2004: Ctesias de Cnide, La Perse – L'Inde – Autres Fragments. Paris: Budé, Les Belles Lettres.

== The genre of the Persica ==
Ctesias' Persica fits into a larger tradition of ancient Greek historical and ethnographical works dealing with Near Eastern history and culture. The earliest Greek writers of Persica have been collected among Jacoby's Fragmenta historicorum Graecorum and include Hecataeus of Miletus (1), Hellanicus of Lesbos (4), Charon of Lampsacus (262), Dionysius of Miletus (687) and Xanthus of Sardis (765). Some of these authors, like Dionysius, had a narrow focus on the Greco-Persian wars of the early 5th century BC, while others, such as Hellanicus, adopted a broader approach similar to Ctesias' and dealt with the whole history of the Assyrian, Median and Persian empires.

The most important writer concerned with Persian history before Ctesias was Herodotus of Halicarnassus, whose immensely influential Histories have been preserved in their entirety. Ctesias seems to have been the earliest writer to attempt to write Persian history after Herodotus. Ctesias' Persica has often been seen as a response to Herodotus. Photius, who was still able to read Ctesias' Persica, wrote:

[he] gives an account of Cyrus, Cambyses, the Magian, Darius, and Xerxes, in which he differs almost entirely from Herodotus, whom he accuses of falsehood in many passages and calls an inventor of fables (trans. Rene Henry)

Many scholars accept that the relation of Ctesius' Persica to Herodotus was antagonistic. Other scholars, such as Bichler, think that Ctesias parodied Herodotus and wrote "like a kind of persiflage and... not a serious attempt to correct Herodotus".

== Ctesias' sources and the style of the Persica ==
It is generally agreed that Ctesias was influenced by the earlier writers of the Persica tradition. More importantly, he seems to have been the first Greek writer to view Persia from within, as a long-standing member of the Persian court. As such, he also seems to have had access to the "royal archives" and "royal parchments". The existence of such administrative documents in Persia remains contested. Additionally, it is not known whether Ctesias knew Old Persian (or whichever language was in use at the court), and, even if he knew the language, it is generally doubted that he could read the cuneiform. Interestingly, it has been argued that the most important source for Ctesias' work might have been the oral narratives (epics, romances and historical accounts), which were typical of the ancient Near Eastern societies. Thus, Ctesias' account would be valuable as presenting Persian history in the way in which the Persians themselves customarily viewed it.

Since Ctesias' original language is preserved only on a single fragment, it is very difficult to gauge his style of writing. His openness to oral traditions and emphasis on melodramatic episodes at royal court (centered, in the latter part of the work, around the figure of the Queen Parysatis) suggest a work that is between history and fiction (also known as "faction") and akin to the novelistic genre. An important testimony on Ctesias' dramatic style comes from Dionysius of Halicarnassus (On Style 3):

The charge of garrulity often brought against Ctesias on the ground of his repetitions can perhaps in many passages be established, but in many instances it is his critics who fail to appreciate the writer's vividness. The same word is repeated because this often makes a greater impression. (trans. W. Rhys Roberts)

Dionysius goes on to cite the way in which Ctesias styled a pathetic dialogue between the Queen Mother Parysatis and a messenger informing her of the death of her son Cyrus the Younger. Dionysius concludes that:

Altogether this poet (for a poet Ctesias may well be called) is an artist in vividness throughout his writings.(trans. W. Rhys Roberts)

== Reception of the Persica ==
While Ctesias' paradoxographical Indica had a rough reception in Antiquity and was mocked for its fantasies by a variety of authors including Lucian, it has been argued that the reception of the much more grounded Persica was generally more positive. It had certainly influenced two later authors of Persica, who wrote in the last decade of Achaemenid rule in Persia: Dinon of Colophon and Heracleides of Cumae. Plutarch, who used the Persica as a source for his Life of Artaxerxes, described Ctesias' works as a "miscellaneous jumble of wild and incredible tales", but considered his perspective as an insider in the Persian court to nonetheless be valuable.

In the late 19th and early 20th century scholarship, Persica have often been viewed as unreliable and disappointing. In the second half of the 20th century, in the wake of Edward Saïd's controversial 1978 book, the charge of unreliability has been supplemented by a charge of orientalism. The most vocal proponent of that view had been the historian Heleen Sancisi-Weerdenburg.

More recently, scholars have tried to view Ctesias on his own terms and in light of what he himself was trying to achieve: not a history, but a vibrant and dramatic narrative based, among other things, on his own experience in the Persian royal court and on Persian oral traditions he came into contact with.

== Sources ==
- Bichler, R. (2004) "Some Observations on the Image of the Assyrian and Babylonian Kingdoms with the Greek Tradition", in R. Rollinger and C. Ulf (eds), Commerce and Monetary Systems in the Ancient World: Means of Transition and Cultural Interaction. Munich: Franze Ateiner Verlag, pp. 499–518.
- Drews, Robert. The Greek accounts of eastern history. Washington, DC: Center for Hellenic Studies, 1973.
- Jacoby, F. (1922), sv. Ktesias, R.E. XI col. 2032–2037.
- Llewellyn-Jones, Lloyd, and James Robson. Ctesias' History of Persia: Tales of the Orient. Routledge, 2010.
- Rhys-Roberts, W. (ed.) (1910), Dionysius of Halicarnassus on Literary Composition. London: Macmillan, 1910.
- Sancisi-Weerdenburg, H. (1987) "Decadence in the Empire of Decadence in the Sources? From Source to Synthesis: Ctesias", in H. Sancisi-Weerdenburg (ed.), Achaemenid History, Vol. I. Sources, Structures and Synthesis. Leiden: E. J. Brill, pp. 33–45.
- Sharwood Smith, John E. Greece and the Persians. Bristol Classical Press, 1990.
- Waters, Matt. Ctesias' Persica in Its Near Eastern Context. University of Wisconsin Press, 2017.
