= Atmeydanı incident =

Uprising in the Ottoman Empire

Atmeydanı incident (Turkish: Atmeydanı Vakası) was an uprising which occurred at the Hippodrome of Constantinople (Turkish: Atmeydanı) in Constantinople, the capital of the Ottoman Empire, in 1648.

== Background ==
Sultan Ibrahim (reigned 1640–1648) of the Ottoman Empire was dethroned on 12 August 1648. Several days later he was killed. His 6-year-old son Mehmet IV (reigned 1648–1687) ascended the throne. It was a custom in the Ottoman Empire that the new sultan tip the soldiers (Turkish: Culus bahşişi) when he ascended the throne. However, due to the costly Cretan War ongoing, the regents of the sultan were unable to pay the required tip. The sipahi corps, the main cavalry units of the Ottoman Army, were especially complainant, for they were not paid soldiers.

== Incident ==
Two months later, the Ottoman Porte, the government, decided to send sipahi units to Crete. The angry sipahis returned to Constantinople to demand their tips along with some other rights. Some residents in Constantinople also joined them. They gathered in the square named Atmeydanı, the Hippodrome from the Byzantine times, situated in front of the Topkapı Palace. According to the Romanian historian Nicolae Iorga (1871–1940), Valide sultan Kösem Sultan, the mother of Sultan Ibrahim, secretly supported the mob. The demands became more extreme, including demands for the execution of some statesmen, although the government met most of them in the beginning. One of the negotiators sent to the scene, actually a member of the janissary corps, was killed by the mob. Then, the janissaries loyal to the palace were charged over the sipahis. After bloody clashes, the better organized janissaries defeated the sipahis.

== Aftermath ==
The sipahis were subdued. However, the janissaries gained too much power and soon began to create unrest in Constantinople. The troubled years of the Empire lasted until the beginning of Köprülü era in 1656.
