= Oebares =

6th century BC Persian officer to Cyrus the Great

Oebares (Old Persian: Va(h)ubara) was a Persian officer of Cyrus the Great (fl. c. 6th century BCE). When Cyrus sent Petisaces to bring Astyages to court from his satrapy, Oebares caused Petisaces to leave the old king Astyages to die in the desert, when this was discovered he proceeded to starve himself to death to avoid falling to an act of vengeance from Astyages' daughter, Amytis.

He is mentioned in Photius' Bibliotheca.
