= Harpagus =

6th-century BC Median general

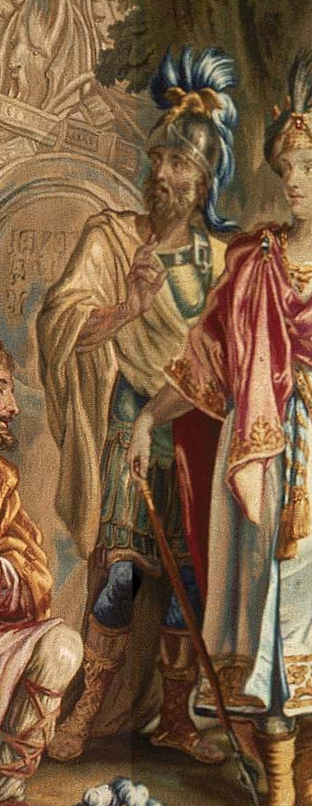
General Harpagus, behind Cyrus the Great (18th century tapestry).

Harpagus, also known as Harpagos (Ancient Greek Ἅρπαγος; Akkadian: Arbaku), was a Median general during the 6th century BC, credited by Herodotus as having put Cyrus the Great on the throne through his defection during the Battle of Pasargadae.

== Biography ==
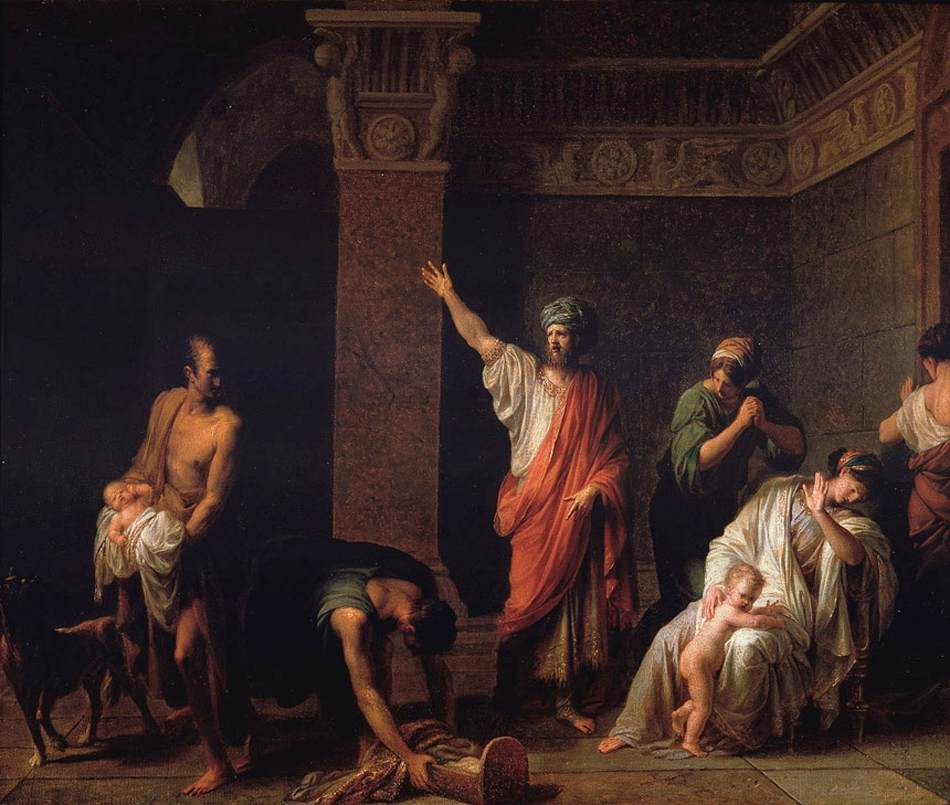
Painting of king Astyages sending Harpagus to kill young Cyrus

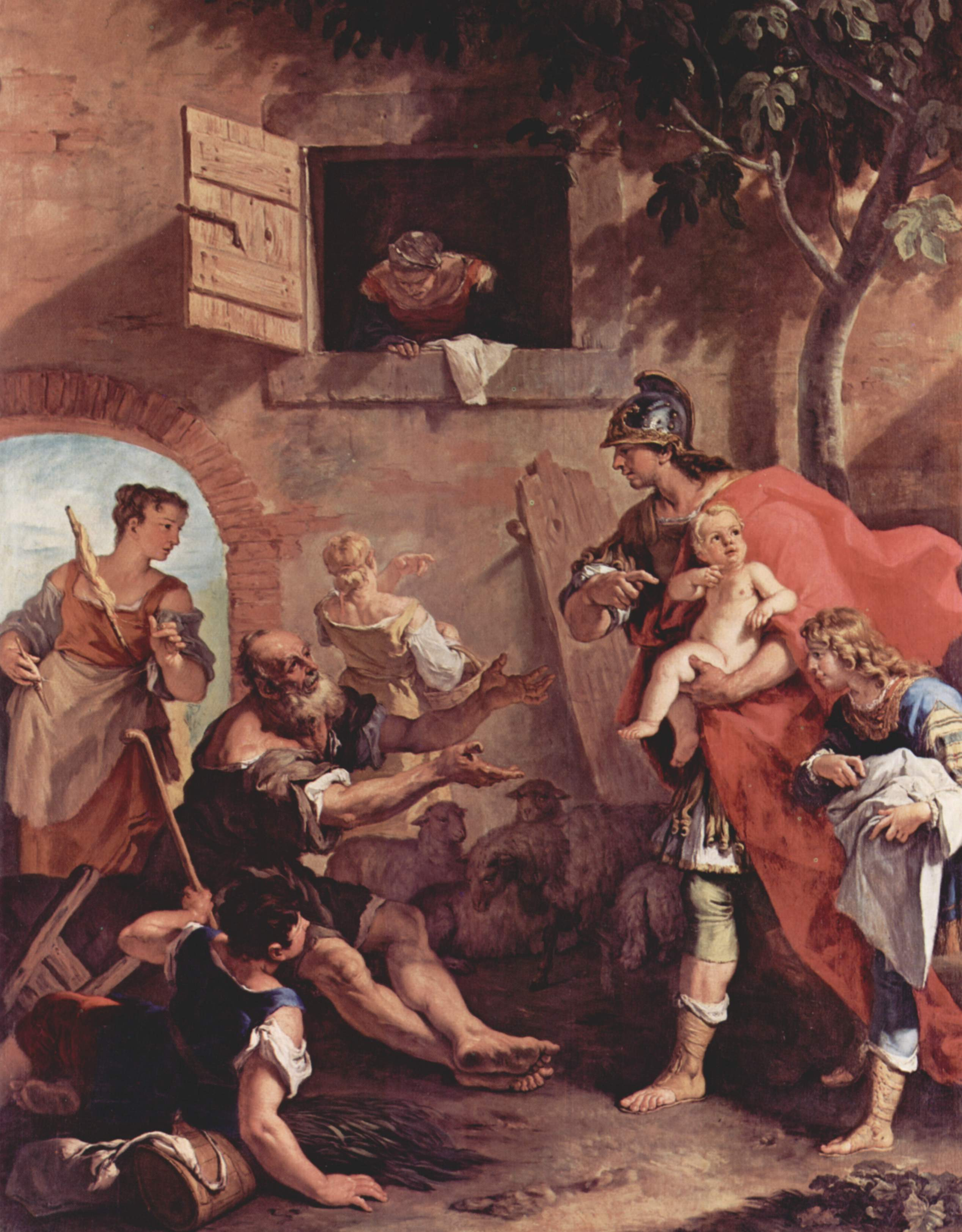
Harpagus bring infant Cyrus to the shepherd. Sebastiano Ricci (1659–1734)

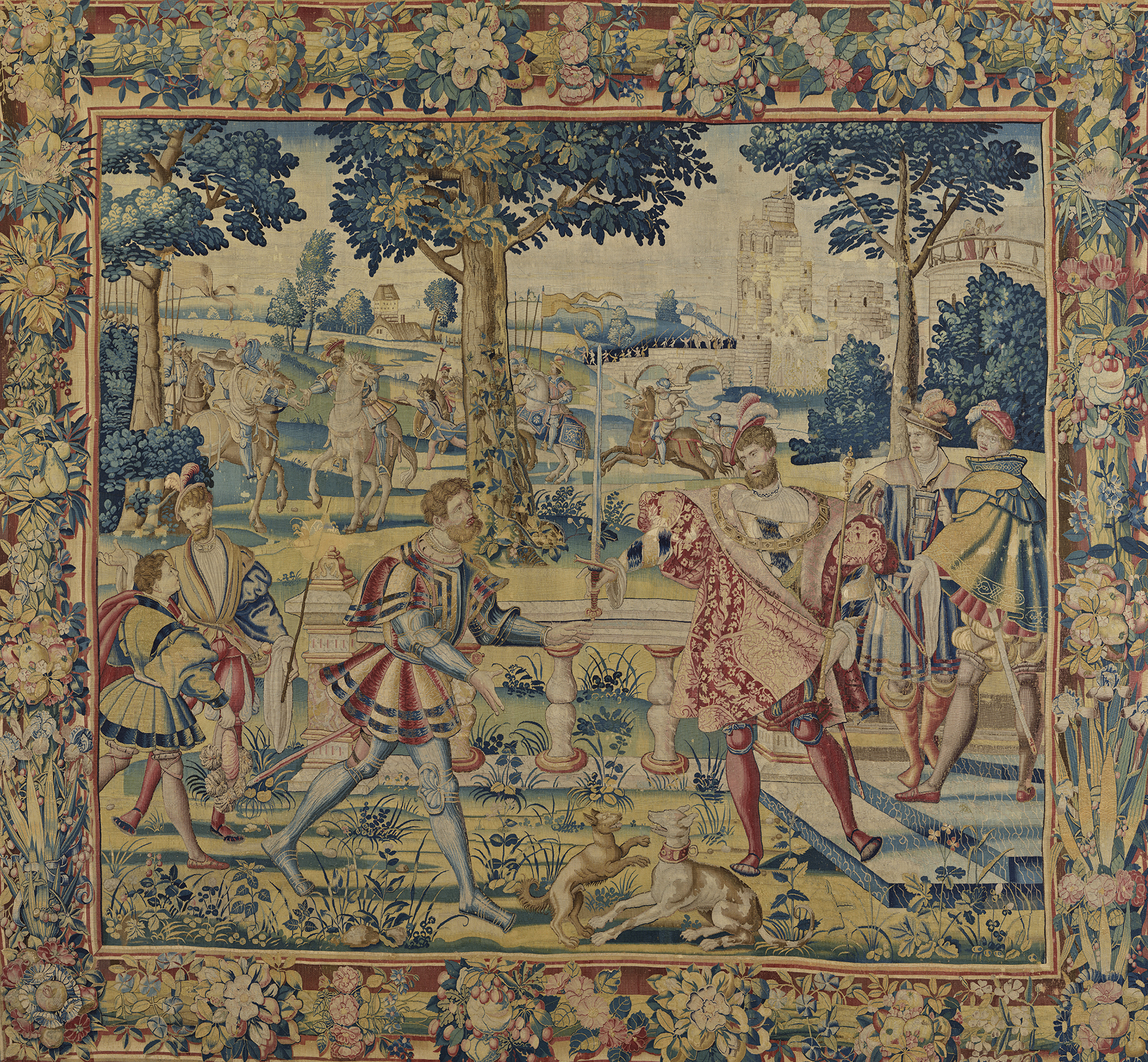
King Astyages places Harpagos in command of his army, by Jan Moy (1535–1550).

According to Herodotus' Histories, Harpagus was a member of the Median royal house who served King Astyages, the last king of Media.

When word reached Astyages that Cyrus was gathering his forces, he ordered Harpagus, as his primary general, to lead the army against Cyrus. After a three-day battle on the plain of Pasargadae, Harpagus took his revenge for the death of his son at the hands of Astyages when he changed his allegiance on the battlefield in favour of Cyrus, resulting in Astyages' defeat and the formation of the Persian Empire.

== Myth ==
Herodotus accounts for the change in Harpagus' support to a version of the cannibal feast of Thyestes. He reports that Astyages, after having a dream that his daughter, Mandane, would give birth to a king who would overthrow him, ordered Harpagus to expose the child at birth. Harpagus, reluctant to spill his own royal blood, gave the child (Cyrus) to a shepherd named Mitradates, who raised him as his own son.

Ten years later, when Cyrus was discovered alive, Astyages cruelly punished Harpagus by killing Harpagus' only son and feeding him to Harpagus during a banquet. It was said that Harpagus did not react during the banquet, other than to gather the pieces of his son and remove them for burial. Astyages then asked his Magi (priests) for their advice about the fate of Cyrus. They told him that the boy, who had been discovered while playing king of the mountain with his friends, had fulfilled the prophecy of becoming a king, albeit in play, and was no longer a danger. On their advice, Astyages sent Cyrus to his parents, Cambyses I and Mandane, in Anšan (southwestern Iran near Shiraz).

Harpagus bided his time, sending gifts to Cyrus to keep contact with him, as he worked to turn the nobles of Media against Astyages. When they were ready, he sent a message to Cyrus, hidden in the belly of a hare, informing him that the Medians would mutiny on the field, should he take arms against his grandfather.

== Harpagus in historical texts ==
Herodotus, The Histories:

"Astyages, as soon as Cyrus was born, sent for Harpagus, a man of his own house and the most faithful of the Medes...."

"When Cyrus beheld the Lydians arranging themselves in order of battle on this plain, fearful of the strength of their cavalry, he adopted a device which Harpagus, one of the Medes, suggested to him. He collected together all the camels that had come in the train of his army to carry the provisions and the baggage, and taking off their loads, he mounted riders upon them accoutred as horsemen. These he commanded to advance in front of his other troops against the Lydian horse..."

"Astyages, meanwhile, took the son of Harpagus, and slew him, after which he cut him in pieces, and roasted some portions before the fire, and boiled others..."

"When Cyrus grew to manhood, and became known as the bravest and most popular of all his compeers, Harpagus, who was bent on revenging himself upon Astyages, began to pay him court by gifts and messages..."

"Upon Mazares' death, Harpagus was sent down to the coast to succeed to his command. He also was of the race of the Medes, being the man whom the Median king, Astyages, feasted at the unholy banquet, and who lent his aid to place Cyrus upon the throne..."

"After conquering the Ionians, Harpagus proceeded to attack the Carians, the Caunians, and the Lycians. The Ionians and Aeolians were forced to serve in his army..."

The Chronicle of Nabonidus:

"King Astyages called up his troops and marched against Cyrus, king of Anšan (southwest Iran), in order to meet him in battle. The army of Astyages revolted against him and in fetters they delivered him to Cyrus. Cyrus marched against the country Ecbatana; the royal residence he seized; silver, gold, other valuables of the country Ecbatana he took as booty and brought to Anšan."

== Military career ==
According to Herodotus, after the defeat of Astyages (550 BC), Harpagus continued his military career under the new ruler Cyrus II:

- Harpagus suggested using camels as the front line against the Lydians in Cyrus II's war against Croesus, thereby scattering the Lydian cavalry (the horses panicked at the smell of the dromedaries).
- Following a revolt by the Lydians and the death of Cyrus's infantry commander, General Mazares, Cyrus II gave responsibility for the conquest of Asia Minor to Harpagus, who went on to serve as Cyrus's most successful general.
- The Median general followed his victory at Lydia by conquering Ionia, Phoenicia, Caria, Lycia and many other regions of Asia Minor (except Miletus, which had earned the favour of Cyrus through their great sage Thales's advice to stay neutral in the Lydian war).
- Harpagus was also known for innovations in engineering techniques; specifically, the use of earthwork ramps and mounds during sieges (a method later employed by Alexander the Great during his siege of Tyre) and the use of mountain climbers to scale opponents' walls:

When he came to Ionia, he took the cities by building mounds; he would drive the men within their walls and then build mounds against the walls and so take the cities.

— Herodotus 1.162

- Despite Harpagus' reputation for mercy, the residents of Xanthos in Lycia committed suicide rather than surrender to him, saying that they had never been conquered.

== Later life ==
After the completion of his conquests, Harpagus was appointed Satrap of Asia Minor. His descendants became the royal family of Lycia in what is now southwest Turkey.
