= Nabonidus Chronicle =

Ancient Babylonian text

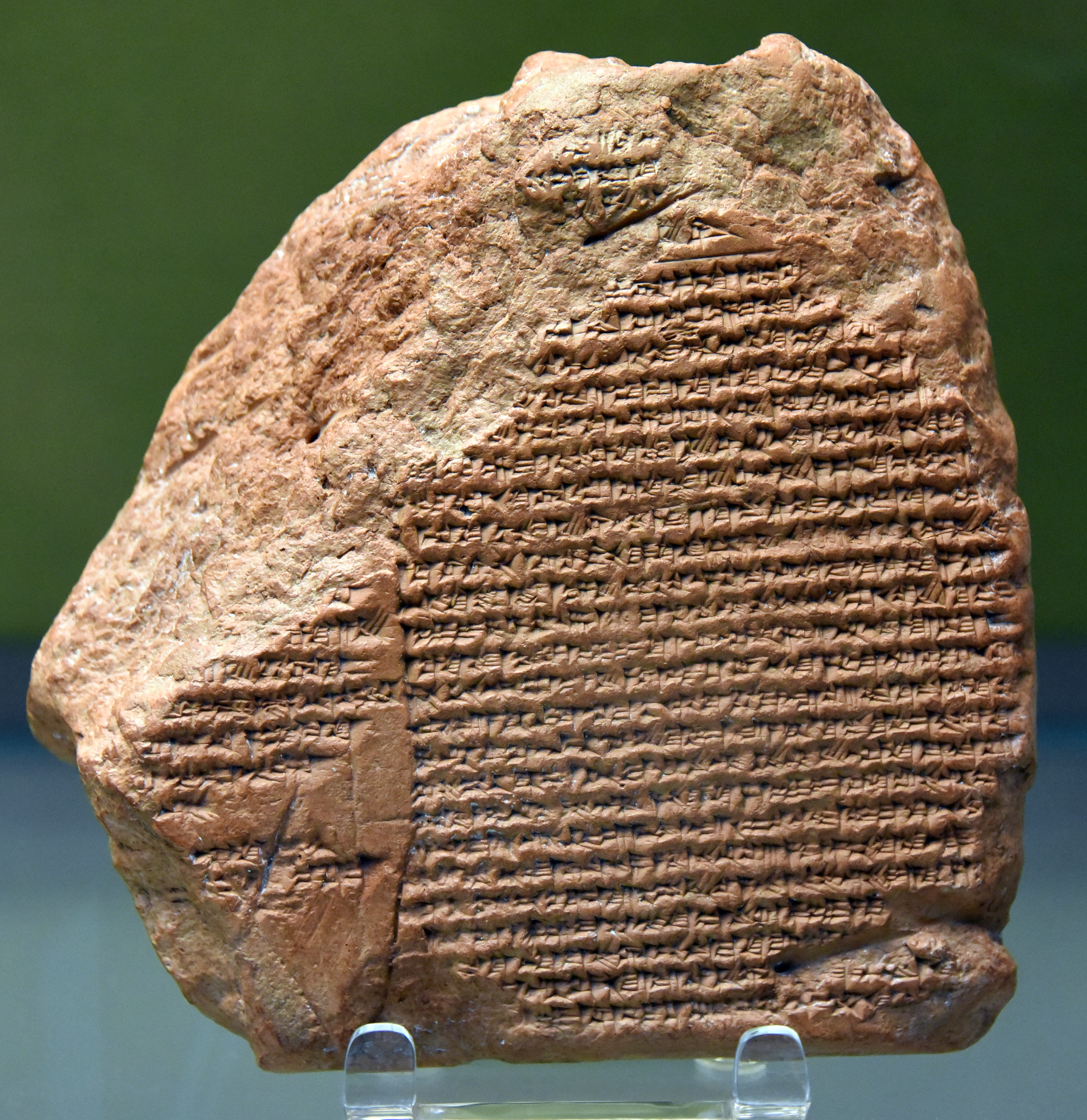
- Material: Clay
- Height: 14 cm
- Width: 14 cm
- Discovered: 1879
- Present location: British Museum, London, UK

The Nabonidus Chronicle is an ancient Babylonian text, part of a larger series of Babylonian Chronicles inscribed in cuneiform script on clay tablets. It deals primarily with the reign of Nabonidus, the last king of the Neo-Babylonian Empire, covers the conquest of Babylon by the Persian king Cyrus the Great, and ends with the start of the reign of Cyrus's son Cambyses II, spanning a period from 556 BC to some time after 539 BC. It provides a rare contemporary account of Cyrus's rise to power and is the main source of information on this period; Amélie Kuhrt describes it as "the most reliable and sober [ancient] account of the fall of Babylon."

The chronicle is thought to have been copied by a scribe during the Seleucid period (4th-1st century BC) but the original text was probably written during the late 6th or early 5th century BC. Similarities with the Nabonassar to Shamash-shum-ukin Chronicle, another of the Babylonian Chronicles, suggest that the same scribe may have been responsible for both chronicles. If so, it may date to the reign of Darius I of Persia (c. 549 BC–486 BC).

== Description of the tablet ==
The Nabonidus Chronicle is preserved on a single clay tablet now kept at the British Museum in London. Like the other Babylonian Chronicles, it lists in an annalistic (year-by-year) fashion the key events of each year, such as the accession and deaths of kings, major military events, and notable religious occurrences. It follows a standard pattern of reporting only events of immediate relevance to Babylonia, making it of somewhat limited utility as a source for a wider history of the region. The tablet itself is fairly large, measuring 14 cm wide by 14 cm long, but is significantly damaged with its bottom and most of the left-hand side missing. The text was composed in two columns on each side, originally consisting of some 300-400 lines. What remains is extremely fragmentary; little more than 75 lines of text are still legible. The missing portions consist of most of the first and fourth columns, along with the bottom of the second and the top of the third. There appears to have been a colophon at the bottom of the tablet, but it too is largely missing.

Although the writing is of a good standard, the copying was decidedly imperfect and the scribe made a number of errors that are visible in the text.

The tablet was acquired by the British Museum in 1879 from the antiquities dealers Spartali & Co. Its original place of discovery is unknown, though it has been presumed that it came from the ruins of Babylon. It possibly represents part of an official collection of annals in the possession of the Achaemenid governors of Babylon. The text, known at the time as "the Annals of Nabonidus", was first discussed in print by Sir Henry Rawlinson in the Athenaeum magazine of 14 February 1880, with the first English translation being published two years later by Professor T. G. Pinches in the Transactions of the Society for Biblical Archaeology (1882). It has since been translated by a number of scholars, notably Sidney Smith, A. Leo Oppenheim, Albert Kirk Grayson, Jean-Jacques Glassner, and Amélie Kuhrt.

== The text ==
The text of the chronicle begins presumably with the accession of Nabonidus in 556 BC, though the start of the text is so poorly preserved that none of this portion is legible. It mentions campaigns by Nabonidus against a place named Hume and unnamed localities in "the West" (Arabia?). Cyrus's pillaging of Ecbatana, the capital of the Median king Astyages, is recorded in the sixth year of the reign of Nabonidus. The chronicle goes on to describe in several entries the self-imposed exile of Nabonidus in the Arabian oasis of Tema (mentioned as Teiman in Hebrew in the Dead Sea Scrolls fragment 4Q242 known as the Testimony of Nebonidus dated to 150 BC) and the disruption that this caused to the Akitu (New Year) festival for a period of ten years. The eighth year is purposefully left blank; apparently the scribe did not have any significant events to record for that year. Another campaign by Cyrus is recorded in the ninth year, possibly representing his attack on Lydia and capture of Sardis.

Much of the rest of the text is fragmentary. A possible reference to fighting and Persia appears in what is presumably the entry for the sixteenth year. A long surviving section describes the events of Nabonidus's seventeenth and final year as king, when Cyrus invaded and conquered Babylonia. The celebration of the Akitu festival is recorded, indicating Nabonidus's return to Babylon. The chronicle provides no information on why Cyrus chose to invade Babylonia at that time but records that the gods of various cities "entered Babylon", apparently referring to an in-gathering of cultic statues in advance of the Persian invasion – perhaps a measure taken by Nabonidus to prevent the Persians capturing the divine idols. It provides a terse description of the Battle of Opis, in which the Persians decisively defeated Nabonidus's army, massacred the retreating Babylonians and took a great haul of loot. The Persian army went on to capture the cities of Sippar and Babylon itself without further conflict. Cyrus is reported to have been received with joy by the city's inhabitants and appointed local governors. The gods that had previously been brought to Babylon were returned to their home cities on the orders of Cyrus. The legible portion of the text ends with a lengthy period of mourning for the lately deceased king's wife (presumably meaning the wife of Cyrus, as Nabonidus was no longer king by this time) and a mention of Cambyses, the son of Cyrus. Only a few scattered words are legible in the remainder of the tablet.

== Analysis ==
The Nabonidus Chronicle appears to have been composed by the (Babylonian) priests of Marduk, the chief god of Babylon. It has been characterised as "a piece of propaganda at Cyrus's service" and as possibly "the result of the propaganda of the priesthood of Marduk to vilify Nabonidus". Julye Bidmead attributes the priests' hostility to Nabonidus's unsuccessful attempts to introduce the worship of the moon god Sîn. In particular, the chronicle repeatedly asserts that the Akitu festival could not be held because of Nabonidus's absence. This is dubious, as others could have participated in the celebration in Nabonidus's place. The chronicle is seen as part of a series of pro-Persian documents, including the Cyrus cylinder and Verse Account of Nabonidus, that attack Nabonidus for alleged religious infidelity and contrast his actions with those of Cyrus and Cambyses. However, Amélie Kuhrt describes it as "the most reliable and sober ancient account of the fall of Babylon."

== See also ==
- Babylonian Chronicle
- Nabonidus
