= Eclipse of Thales =

Ancient solar eclipse, possibly predicted

The eclipse of Thales was a solar eclipse, which was, according to the ancient Greek historian Herodotus (writing about 150 years later), accurately predicted by the Greek philosopher Thales of Miletus. If Herodotus's account is accurate, this eclipse is the earliest recorded as being known in advance of its occurrence. According to Herodotus, the change of day into night was interpreted as an omen, and interrupted a battle in a long-standing war between the Medes and the Lydians in Anatolia (present-day Turkey). The only solar eclipse matching the presumed place, era, and conditions of visibility necessary to explain the historical event is the eclipse of 28 May 585 BC. (Note: This date is based on the proleptic Julian calendar, which does not include a "year zero"; astronomically the year is -584.) How exactly Thales could have predicted a solar eclipse remains uncertain, however, and modern scholars are sceptical of the story's veracity. Some have argued for different dates, or for other interpretations of Herodotus's account.

== Ancient accounts ==
Map of the battle location

Herodotus writes that in the sixth year of the war, the Lydians and the Medes were engaged in an indecisive battle, sometimes called the "Battle of the Eclipse", when suddenly day turned into night, leading to both parties halting the fighting and negotiating a peace agreement. Herodotus also mentions that the loss of daylight had been predicted by Thales of Miletus. He does not, however, mention the location of the battle. Nor, according to the quotation below, does he mention the exact date or even the approximate season of the eclipse, only the year.

Afterwards, on the refusal of Alyattes to give up his suppliants when Cyaxares sent to demand them of him, war broke out between the Lydians and the Medes, and continued for five years, with various success. In the course of it the Medes gained many victories over the Lydians, and the Lydians also gained many victories over the Medes. Among their other battles there was one night engagement. As, however, the balance had not inclined in favour of either nation, another combat took place in the sixth year, in the course of which, just as the battle was growing warm, day was on a sudden changed into night. This event had been foretold by Thales, the Milesian, who forewarned the Ionians of it, fixing for it the very year in which it actually took place. The Medes and Lydians, when they observed the change, ceased fighting, and were alike anxious to have terms of peace agreed on.

As part of the terms of the peace agreement, Alyattes's daughter Aryenis was married to Cyaxares's son Astyages, and the Halys River (present-day Kızılırmak River) was declared to be the border of the two warring kingdoms.

Other ancient sources after Herodotus also mention the eclipse. Diogenes Laërtius (3rd century AD) says that Xenophanes, who lived in the same century as Thales, was impressed with the prediction, and he also gives additional testimonies from the pre-Socratics Democritus and Heraclitus. Cicero (1st century BC) mentions that Thales was the first man to successfully predict a solar eclipse during the reign of Astyages, the last king of the Median empire. Pliny the Elder (1st century AD) mentions as well that Thales had predicted a solar eclipse during the reign of Alyattes of Lydia.

== Modern interpretations ==
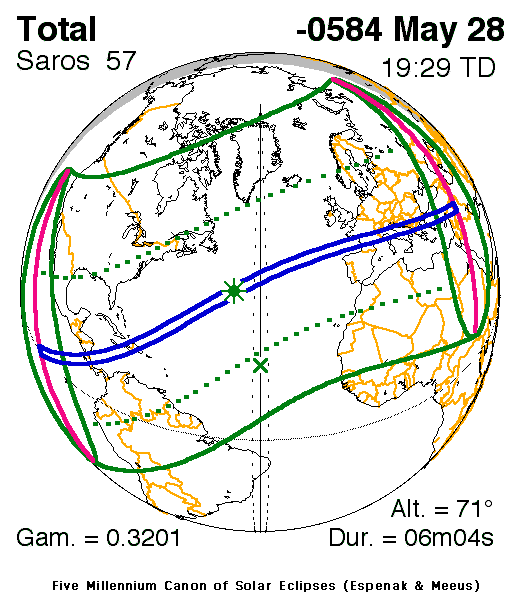
Map of the eclipse of 28 May 585 BC

If the description by Herodotus of the event is read as a solar eclipse, then based on modern astronomical calculations, it can be identified with an eclipse on 28 May 585 BC which peaked over the Atlantic Ocean at 37.9°N 46.2°W, whose umbral path reached southwestern Anatolia in the evening hours. For the location of the battle, some scholars assume the Halys River, as it was located in the border region between both kingdoms, and is just within the error margin of the eclipse's computed path. American writer Isaac Asimov described this battle as the earliest historical event whose date is known with precision to the day, and called the prediction "the birth of science". Other dates have been suggested, such as 21 September 582 BC or 16 March 581 BC.

However, such a reading is disputed by some historians of science. At the time of Thales' purported prediction, it was not yet known that eclipses were caused by the Moon coming between the Earth and the Sun, a fact that would not be discovered until over a century later by either Anaxagoras or Empedocles. If the account is true, it has been suggested that Thales would have had to calculate the timing of any eclipse by recognizing patterns in the periodicities of eclipses. It has been postulated that Thales may have used the Saros cycle in his determination, or that he may have had some knowledge of Babylonian astronomy. However, Babylonians were far from being able to predict the local conditions of solar eclipses at that point, which makes this hypothesis highly unlikely. At the time, there was no known cycle that could be reliably used to predict an eclipse for a given location and, therefore, any accurate prediction would have been down to luck.

Others are skeptical of other details of the story. The eclipse would have occurred shortly before sunset at any plausible site of the battle, and it was very uncommon for battles to take place at that time of day. Furthermore, based on the list of Medean kings and their regnal lengths reported elsewhere by Herodotus, Cyaxares died 10 years before the eclipse.

An alternative theory is that the solar eclipse story is a misinterpretation of Herodotus's text, and that the battle might have instead been disrupted by a lunar eclipse just before moonrise, at dusk. If the warriors had planned their battle activities expecting a full moon as in the previous few days, it would have been a shock to have dusk fall suddenly as an occluded Moon rose. If this theory is correct, the battle's date would not be 585 BC (date given by Pliny based on date of solar eclipse), but possibly 3 September 609 BC, or 4 July 587 BC, dates when such dusk-time lunar eclipses did occur.

== See also ==
- Assyrian eclipse
- Mursili's eclipse
