= Nicolaus of Damascus =

1st-century BC historian and philosopher, the chief minister of Herod the Great

Nicolaus of Damascus Νικόλαος Δαμασκηνός
- Born: Νικόλαος Δαμασκηνός c. 64 BC; Damascus
- Died: after 4 AD; Rome
- Occupations: Historian; Diplomat; Philosopher

Nicolaus of Damascus (Greek: Νικόλαος Δαμασκηνός, Nikolāos Damaskēnos; Latin: Nicolaus Damascenus; c. 64 BC – after 4 AD) was a Greek historian, diplomat and philosopher who lived during the Augustan age of the Roman Empire. His name is derived from that of his birthplace, Damascus. His output was vast, but it is nearly all lost. His chief work was a universal history in 144 books. Considerable remains of two works written late in his life exist: a life of Augustus and an autobiography. He also wrote a life of Herod, philosophical works, and tragedies and comedies.

There is an article on him in the Suda.

== Life ==
He was born around 64 BC. Nicolaus is known to have had a brother named Ptolemy, who served in the court of Herod as a type of book-keeper or accountant.

He was an intimate friend of Herod the Great, who died a number of years before him. He was also the tutor of the children of Mark Antony and Cleopatra (born in c. 68 BC), according to Sophronius. He went to Rome with Herod Archelaus, to defend the young man's claim to the throne upon the death of his father Herod the Great.

Some modern scholars such as Heinrich Ewald have speculated that Nicolaus was of Jewish origin; since then, the question whether Nicolaus was a Jew or a Greek has been much debated in scholarship. If he had non-Greek roots, he must have been at least thoroughly hellenised. Later ancient sources refer to him as "the Peripatetic". Since Nicolaus wrote a work On the Psyche, he may well have been, like Philo, in the school of the Pythagoreans or Platonists and been part of the syncretisation of Judaic monotheism with the monotheism (the Monad/The Good) of those two schools.

== Universal History ==
Towards the end of his life he composed a Universal History in 144 books, although the Suda mentions only 80 books. But references to books 2, 4, 5, 6, 7, (8), 96, 103, 104, 107, 108, 110, 114, 123 and 124 are known.

Extensive fragments of the first seven books are preserved in quotation in the Constantinian Excerpts, compiled at the order of Byzantine Emperor Constantine VII Porphyrogenitus. These cover the history of the Assyrians, Medes, Greeks, Lydians, and Persians, and are important also for Biblical history.

The Jewish historian Josephus probably used this work for his history of Herod in his Antiquities of the Jews (Ant. 15–17) because where Nicolaus stops, in the reign of Herod Archelaus, the account of Josephus suddenly becomes more cursory. Josephus also references Nicolaus' history on Abram and in book 7 of Antiquities of the Jews on the Jewish King David.

For portions dealing with Greek myth and oriental history he was dependent on other, now lost works, of variable quality. Where he relied on Ctesias, the value of his work is slim. Robert Drews has written:

Classical scholars are agreed that Nicolaus's history of the East, and especially his story of Cyrus, was taken from Ctesias's Persica, a work written early in the fourth century B.C. This work has with justification been denounced by both Assyriologists and classicists as a totally unreliable guide to Mesopotamian history.

== Life of Augustus ==
He wrote a Life of Augustus (Bios Kaisaros), which seems to have been completed before the death of the emperor in AD 14. The time-span treated is uncertain. Two long excerpts remain, the first concerning Octavius' youth, the second Caesar's assassination; both survive because they are quoted in the Constantinian Excerpts, a Greek anthology of excerpts commissioned under Byzantine Emperor Constantine VII Porphyrogenitus.

== Autobiography ==
He also wrote an autobiography, the date of which is uncertain but which must have been written at an old age. It mentions that he wanted to retire, in 4 BC, but was persuaded to travel with Herod Archelaus to Rome.

The fragments that remain deal mainly with Jewish history, focusing on the events at the court of Herod the Great and the succession crisis involving Herod's sons and sister.

== Compendium on Aristotle ==
He composed commentaries on Aristotle. A compendium of excerpts from these is extant in a Syriac manuscript discovered in Cambridge in 1901, (shelfmark Gg. 2. 14). This dates later than 1400, was acquired by Cambridge in 1632, and is very tatty and disarranged. The majority of the manuscript is a work by Dionysius Bar Salibi. The work was probably written in Rome ca. AD 1, when he attracted criticism for being too involved in philosophy to court the wealthy and powerful.

== On the Psyche ==
Porphyrius in On the Faculties of the Soul mentions that Nicolaus of Damascus wrote a book On the Psyche, which stated that the division of the psyche-soul was not founded on quantity, but on quality, like the division of an art or a science. Clearly, by ‘parts’ of the psyche-soul, Nicolaus meant its different faculties.

== On Plants ==
An Arabic translation of his work De Plantis, once attributed to Aristotle, was discovered in Istanbul in 1923. It also exists in a Syriac manuscript at Cambridge.

== Other works ==
In his younger years, he composed some tragedies and comedies, which are now lost. In his later life, he also wrote an ethnographical work on barbaric peoples and their customs.

== The Embassy of an Indian King to Augustus ==
One of the most famous passages is his account of an embassy sent by an Indian king "named Pandion (Pandyan kingdom) or, according to others, Porus" to Augustus in the winter of 20/19 BC. He met with the embassy at Antioch. The embassy was bearing a diplomatic letter in Greek, and one of its members was a sramana who burnt himself alive in Athens to demonstrate his faith. The event made a sensation and was quoted by Strabo and Dio Cassius. A tomb was made to the sramana, still visible in the time of Plutarch, which bore the mention "ΖΑΡΜΑΝΟΧΗΓΑΣ ΙΝΔΟΣ ΑΠΟ ΒΑΡΓΟΣΗΣ" (Zarmanochēgas indos apo Bargosēs – Zarmanochegas, Indian from Bargosa).

To these accounts may be added that of Nicolaus Damascenus. This writer states that at Antioch, near Daphne, he met with ambassadors from the Indians, who were sent to Augustus Caesar. It appeared from the letter that several persons were mentioned in it, but three only survived, whom he says he saw. The rest had died chiefly in consequence of the length of the journey. The letter was written in Greek upon a skin; the import of it was, that Porus was the writer, that although he was sovereign of six hundred kings, yet that he highly esteemed the friendship of Cæsar; that he was willing to allow him a passage through his country, in whatever part he pleased, and to assist him in any undertaking that was just. Eight naked servants, with girdles round their waists, and fragrant with perfumes, presented the gifts which were brought. The presents were a Hermes (i. e. a man) born without arms, whom I have seen, large snakes, a serpent ten cubits in length, a river tortoise of three cubits in length, and a partridge larger than a vulture. They were accompanied by the person, it is said, who burnt himself to death at Athens. This is the practice with persons in distress, who seek escape from existing calamities, and with others in prosperous circumstances, as was the case with this man. For as everything hitherto had succeeded with him, he thought it necessary to depart, lest some unexpected calamity should happen to him by continuing to live; with a smile, therefore, naked, anointed, and with the girdle round his waist, he leaped upon the pyre. On his tomb was this inscription:

ZARMANOCHEGAS, AN INDIAN, A NATIVE OF BARGOSA, HAVING IMMORTALIZED HIMSELF ACCORDING TO THE CUSTOM OF HIS COUNTRY, HERE LIES.

== Sources ==
- Harpers Dictionary of Classical Antiquities, Harper and Brothers, New York, 1898: "Nicolaus"
- Lightfoot, J. B. 1875. On Some Points Connected with the Essenes: II."Origin and Affinity of the Essenes", Note
- Malitz, J. 2003. Nikolaos von Damaskus. Leben des Kaisers Augustus. Texte zur Forschung. Wissenschaftliche Buchgesellschaft.
- Shahin, T. 2020. Fragmente eines Lebenswerks. Historischer Kommentar zur Universalgeschichte des Nikolaos von Damaskus. Collection Latomus 362.
- Wacholder, B. Z. 1962. Nicolaus of Damascus. University of California Studies in History 75.
- Yarrow, L. M. 2006. Historiography at the End of the Republic. Oxford University Press, pp. 67–77.
