= John Thyhsen =

John Thyhsen is an American trumpet player, most notable as one of the longest playing Principal Trumpets of the Philly Pops and Professor Emeritus of Rowan University. He is known for his graceful, melodic style of play and deep knowledge of classical and jazz trumpet.

== History ==
He studied music at Eastman School of Music in Rochester, New York, before beginning his career as a professor of jazz at Northeast Louisiana University.

After moving to Philadelphia to take up professorship as Director of Jazz Studies at Rowan University, closer to his hometown of Phillipsburg, New Jersey, he established himself as one of the city's leading trumpet players, working with several prominent groups including the Philly Pops alongside the well-known pianist and conductor Peter Nero and Opera Philadelphia. John was instrumental in the development of the jazz program at Rowan, inviting prominent artists to play including the Duke's Men, a group of musicians who played with Duke Ellington.

John has over twenty commissioned trumpet pieces, both jazz and classical, written for him. He has also written three books and published several CDs, including A Hoagy Carmichael Memoir.

== More recent activities ==
John currently serves on the board of directors of the Philadelphia Sinfonia and lives outside Philadelphia with his wife, Allison Herz, who is also a professional musician. He continues to play and perform with several small ensembles and tutors music privately in local school districts.
