= Tobias and the Angel (opera) =

Opera by Jonathan Dove

- Opera by Jonathan Dove
- Librettist: David Lan
- Language: English
- Based on: Book of Tobit from the Biblical apocrypha
- Premiere: 7 July 1999; Christ Church Highbury

Tobias and the Angel, described by its composer as a "church opera", is a community opera in one act by Jonathan Dove, with a libretto by David Lan. It premiered on 7 July 1999 in London at Christ Church Highbury. The story is based on the Book of Tobit from the Biblical apocrypha.

== Performance history ==
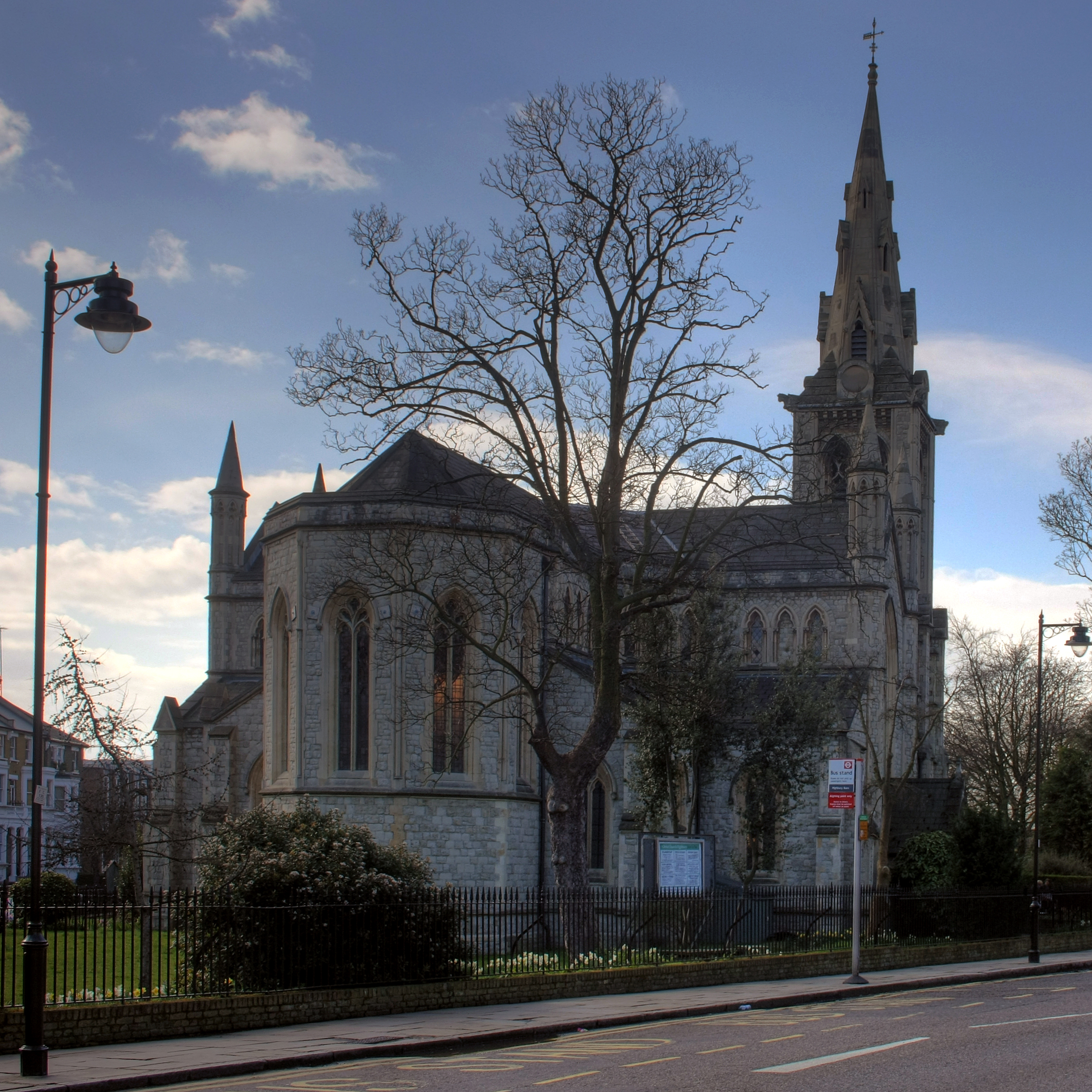
Christ Church Highbury where Tobias and the Angel premiered on 7 July 1999

Tobias and the Angel had its world premiere on 7 July 1999 at Christ Church Highbury in London. The production by Almeida Opera was conducted by David Parry and directed by Kate Brown. The following year the opera was performed at St Matthew's Church, Perry Beeches, in Birmingham in a new production conducted by Brad Cohen and again directed by Kate Brown. It subsequently became the first touring production of the Young Vic theatre during its refurbishment and was revived by the theatre as its first production when it reopened in 2006. The North American premiere of Tobias and the Angel was presented by Opera Vivente at the Emmanuel Episcopal Church in Baltimore on 28 February 2008. The cast featured countertenor David Walker as the Angel. Walker is an artist closely linked to the music of Jonathan Dove and has been a frequent interpreter of the role of the Refugee in Dove's opera Flight. In October 2012 it was the inaugural production of the new Highbury Opera Theatre (HOT) at Union Chapel, London, conducted by Scott Stroman and directed by Louise Radinger.

A recording of Tobias and the Angel conducted by David Charles Abell with the original cast from the 2006 Young Vic performance was released on Chandos Records in August 2010. The score was published by Edition Peters in 2000.

== Roles ==
Roles, voice types, premiere cast
Role	Voice type	Premiere cast, 7 July 1999 Conductor: David Parry
Raphael, an angel	countertenor	Jonathan Peter Kenny
Tobias	tenor	Andrew Burden
Tobit, Tobias's father	baritone	David Barrell
Anna, Tobias's mother	mezzo-soprano	Buddug Verona James
Sara, Tobias's cousin	mezzo-soprano	Ann Taylor
Raguel, Sara's father	tenor	Philip Sheffield
Edna, Sara's mother	soprano	Fiona O'Neill
Ashmodeus, a demon	baritone	Omar Ebrahim
Choruses of adults and children as sparrows, the river, the fish, Raguel's men, wedding guests

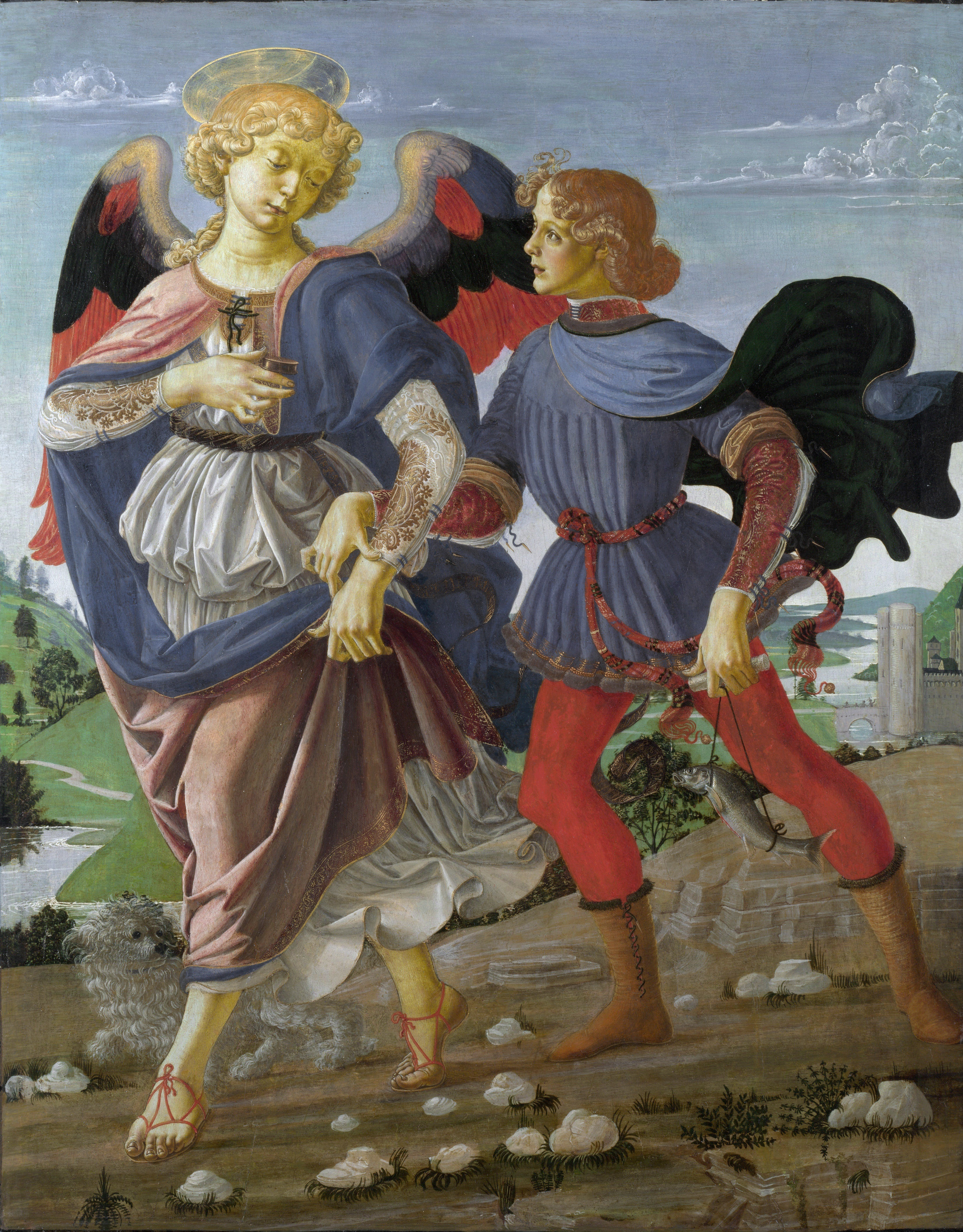
Workshop of Andrea del Verrocchio, Tobias and the Angel (c. 1470–1475)

== Synopsis ==
When a fellow Jew is killed, Tobit (a Jewish man from Nineveh) chooses to break the law by giving him a proper burial. The next morning Tobit is blinded by a group of sparrows (played by a children's chorus) who throw their droppings in his eyes. Remembering that he is owed money by Raguel, a relative in Ecbatana, he sends his son Tobias to reclaim it. A stranger offers to help guide Tobias on his way. On the way, the stranger encourages Tobias, who is something of a good-for-nothing and only interested in dancing, to pay attention to the world around him – to listen to the songs of the trees, the mountains, the river. In the river, they are attacked by a giant fish. Hearing its hidden song, Tobias is able to overcome it, and the stranger tells him to take its heart and gall.

In Ecbatana, meanwhile, Sara, Raguel's daughter, is held under the spell of a devil, Ashmodeus, who kills her husband on their wedding night. When Tobias arrives, he falls in love with Sara. The stranger, however, has eyes only for the unseen devil, and he instructs Tobias to use the fish's heart to break Ashmodeus' spell. This enables Tobias to wed Sara without being killed, and they return to Nineveh. Tobias uses the gall to cure Tobit's blindness, and the stranger reveals himself as the angel Raphael.
