= Christ Church Highbury =

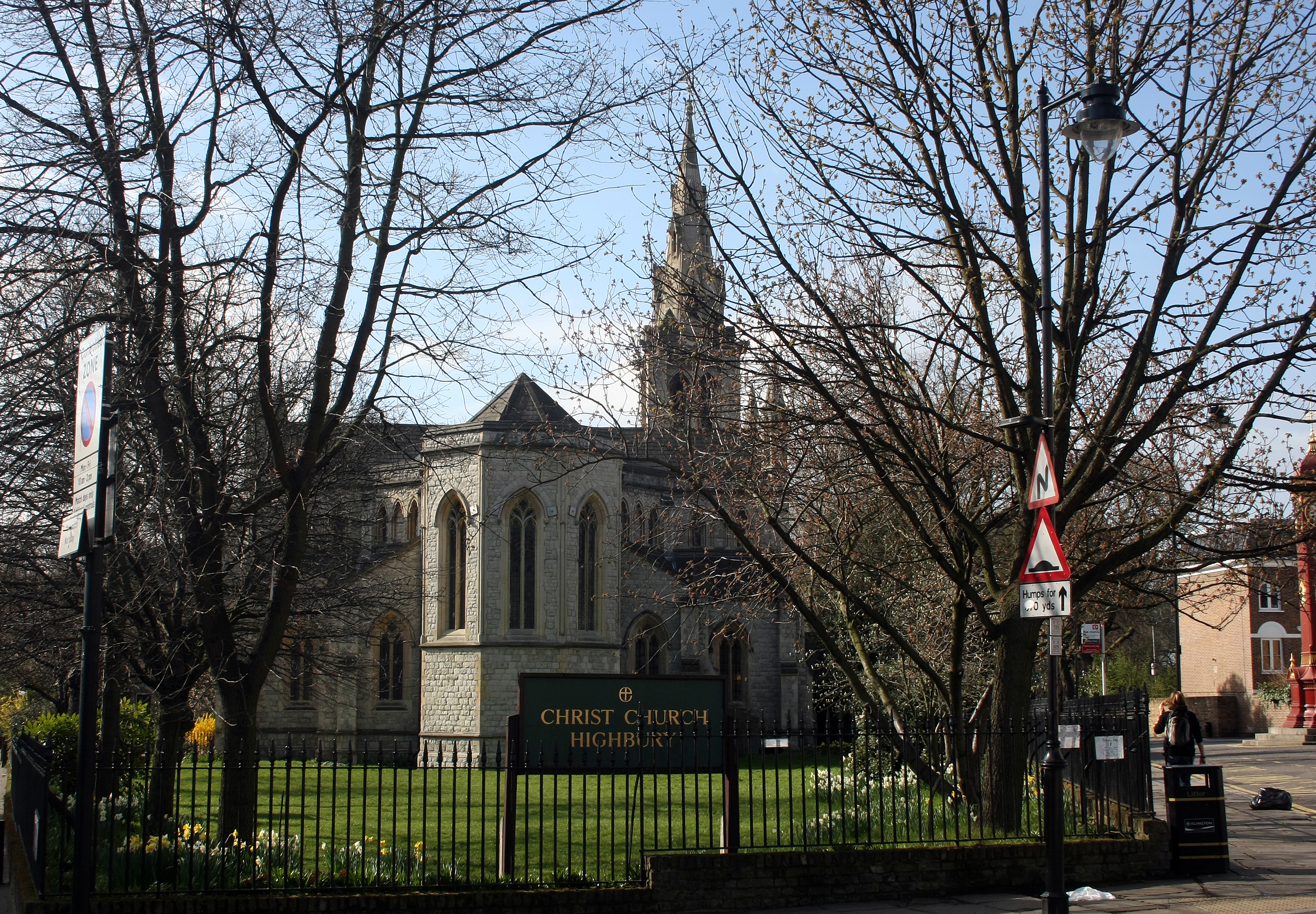
- March, 2009 photo of Christ Church Highbury
- Christ Church Highbury
- 51°33′09″N 0°05′55″W
- Location: 155 Highbury Grove, London
- Country: England
- Denomination: Church of England
- Churchmanship: Open evangelical
- Website: christchurchhighbury.com

Architecture
- Architect: Thomas Allom
- Years built: 1847–1848

Administration
- Diocese: Diocese of London
- Parish: Christ Church with St John and St Saviour

Clergy
- Vicar: The Revd Andrew Chrich

Christ Church Highbury is an Anglican church in Islington, north London, next to Highbury Fields.

== History ==
=== Architecture and construction ===
The site was given by John Dawes, a local benefactor and landlord, and the church was built by Thomas Allom in a cruciform shape with a short chancel, transepts, and nave from 1847 to 1848. Bridget Cherry and Nikolaus Pevsner write that Christ Church Highbury 'is a successful and original use of Gothic for a building on a cruciform plan with broad octagonal crossing. The cross-plan with broad nave and crossing was popular for churches in the low church tradition where an effective auditorium for the spoken word was preferred to a plan designed for an elaborate liturgy.'

Since then, several changes have been made to the church, including the addition of a balcony in 1872, and new rooms for children's work and fellowship in 1980.

== Opening ==
The church was opened in 1848 by Reverend Matthew Anderson Collision, son of Irishman Daniel Marcus Collision and his wife Catherine.

A special service booklet was published to celebrate the occasion: "On the Consecration of the New Church at Highbury, Dedicated to the Saviour as 'Christ's Church'", Reverend M A Collision.

Reverend Collision died on 18 October 1864 at Highbury Grange, aged 58 years. His congregation, numbering ~750, testified their esteem for the deceased by going generally into mourning and subscribing £3000 to purchase an annuity for his widow. Deceased also left twelve children, most of whom are partly provided for.

=== Today ===
After the July 2005 bombings in central London, clergy at the church published a prayer and invited the congregation to pray, 'O Saviour Christ, in whom there is neither Jew nor Greek, East nor West, black nor white, we pray for all, of whatever nation, who are suffering after the explosions in London.'

The former Archbishop of Canterbury, Dr Rowan Williams, visited the church on 10 March 2006, to help alongside the regular volunteers at the church's night shelter for the homeless. According to the Diocese of London web site, Dr Williams 'got on with the job in hand, serving food, making beds and chatting to the guests using the shelter'. Each winter the church provides shelter, a hot meal, bed and breakfast for homeless people of the local area.

The parish of Christ Church Highbury with St. John and St. Saviour in the Archdeaconry of Hackney in the Church of England's Diocese of London. The church standing in the open evangelical tradition and its patron is the Church Pastoral Aid Society (CPAS).

== Music ==
Christ Church Highbury has a rich musical past and present. Its first director of music, Thomas Kilner, regularly published books and articles on psalmody. The church is used regularly by various musical groups in the local area, including Eclectic Voices and Highbury Young Singers. Jonathan Dove's community opera Tobias and the Angel was premiered at the church in 1999, before being performed on a tour by the Young Vic theatre group.

Sunday services range from traditional to contemporary in musical style, with the 9am service consisting of traditional hymns played by piano and/or organ, while the 11am service is more informal with a mix of traditional and contemporary music. Previous Music Director, Scott Stroman, leads a monthly "Jazz Vespers" service, which mixes jazz with hymns old and new. The church was featured on Songs of Praise on 2 February 1997, in which pianist/singer LD Frazier, jazz musician Scott Stroman, and Eclectic Voices made an appearance.
