= Cartele Abad =

Ancient Iranian village

Cartele Abad or Kartil Abad, is an ancient village 80 miles of south Ecbatana (ancient Hamadan). This village was founded during the Sassanid period. Mobed Karteer (Zoroasterian Priest Karteer) founded it, whom the city was named after. Kartil or Cartele is neo-Persian pronunciation for ancient Karteer and Abad is the equivalent of Burg in European countries.
