= David Charles Abell =

American orchestral conductor

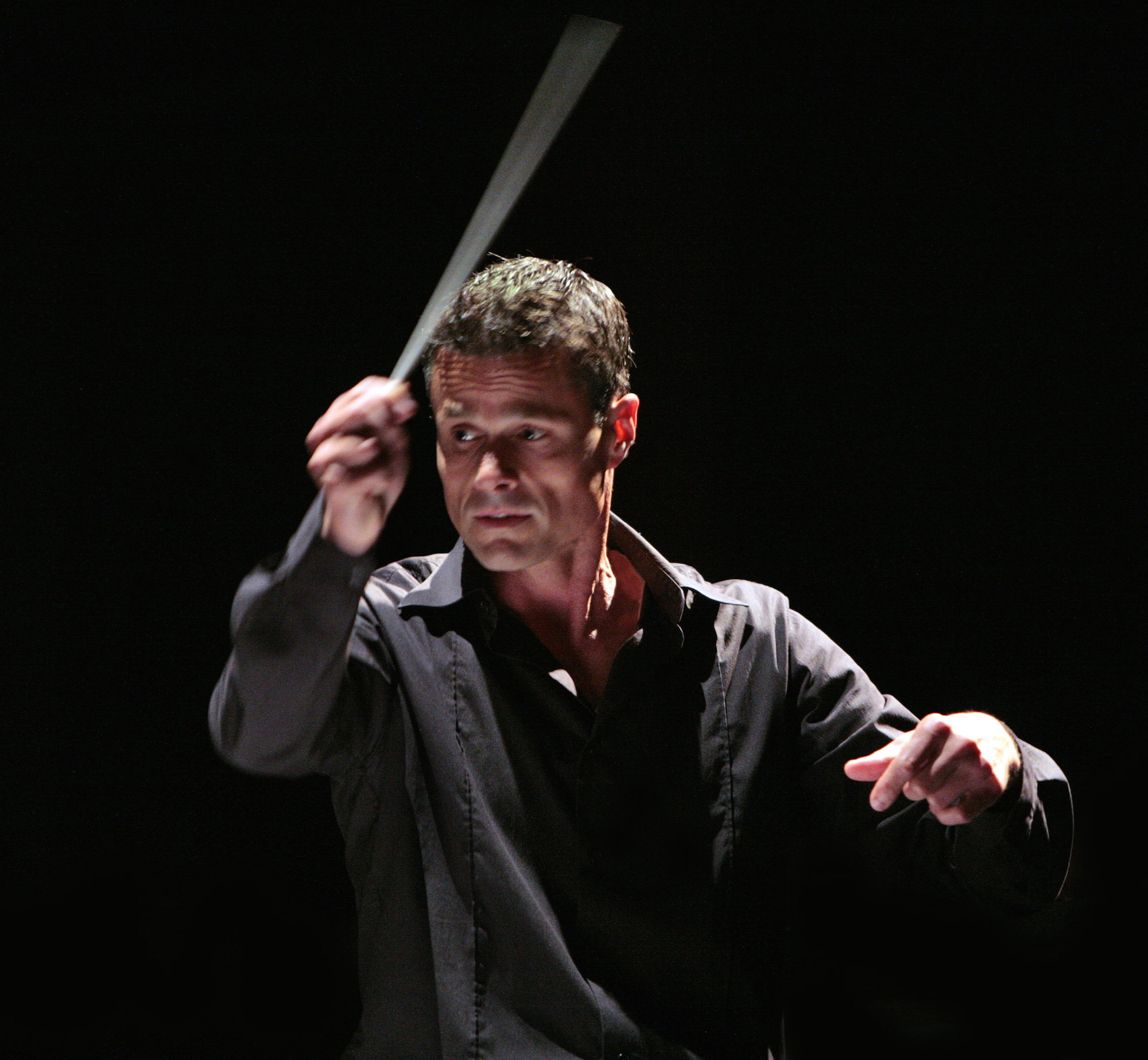
- David Charles Abell conducting at Glimmerglass Opera, 2008

Background information
- Born: David Charles Abell; 1958 (age 67–68); Jacksonville, North Carolina, U.S.
- Genres: Symphonic music, opera, musical theatre
- Occupations: Conductor, musicologist
- Years active: 1982–present
- Website: www.davidcharlesabell.com

David Charles Abell (born 1958) is an American conductor of opera, orchestral music and musical theater. Described as "a protean talent" with "impeccable and inspired" skill as a conductor, he is active in symphonic music, opera and musical theatre. Abell was one of Leonard Bernstein's last protégés, and collaborated with Bernstein on many works during the 1980s.

Abell is known for his television appearances worldwide as conductor of the Les Misérables' 10th and 25th Anniversary concerts. He is also recognized as an authoritative interpreter of the musicals of Stephen Sondheim.

In addition to maintaining an active international opera career, Abell has worked to restore clarity to musical scores with poorly preserved source materials. As of 2017, Abell is a resident of London.

== Early life and education ==
Born in Jacksonville, North Carolina, Abell was raised in the Philadelphia and Chicago areas, studying viola, piano, organ, trumpet and voice. As a member of the Berkshire Boy Choir, he sang in the 1971 world premiere of Leonard Bernstein's Mass at the John F. Kennedy Center for the Performing Arts. The experience sparked his interest in theatrical compositions and fuelled a lasting passion for dramatic music.

In 1976, Abell enrolled at Yale University, where his teachers included John Mauceri and Rob Kapilow. He studied with Nadia Boulanger and Robert D. Levin at the American Conservatory in Fontainebleau before returning to Yale to complete his B.A. in 1981.

== Early professional career ==
In 1982, Abell participated in the inaugural Los Angeles Philharmonic Institute summer school, studying with Bernstein and Daniel Lewis. He continued his postgraduate training from 1983 to 1985 at the Juilliard School under Jorge Mester and Sixten Ehrling

Abell made his professional debut conducting Bernstein's Mass at Berlin's Deutschlandhalle in 1982. The following year he deputized at short notice for John Mauceri conducting Britten's The Turn of the Screw at Washington National Opera. In 1985 he made his New York City Opera debut conducting The Mikado. Abell led San Francisco Opera's 1989 national tour of Carmen and was conductor for City Opera's national tour of The Barber of Seville in 1994.

=== Collaborative work with Leonard Bernstein ===
One of Leonard Bernstein's last protégés, he assisted the composer-conductor on many projects during the 1980s and helped prepare definitive editions of Bernstein's musical theatre scores.

== Work since 1996 ==
Since moving to London in 1996, Abell has conducted orchestras in the UK and abroad, including The Hallé, City of Birmingham, Bournemouth, London Philharmonic, BBC Symphony, Royal Philharmonic Orchestra, BBC National Orchestra of Wales, Seattle Symphony, Hong Kong Philharmonic, Iceland Symphony and West Australian Symphony orchestras. He is a regular guest conductor with the BBC Concert Orchestra, with whom he has appeared five times at the Proms.

=== Opera ===
In recent years, Abell has made debuts at Cincinnati Opera (Porgy and Bess), Lyric Opera of Kansas City (Silent Night), Opera Philadelphia (Die Zauberflöte), and Hawaii Opera Theatre (Eugene Onegin).

=== Musical theatre ===
The driving force behind Stephen Sondheim's 80th birthday celebration at the 2010 BBC Proms, Abell subsequently conducted the 25th anniversary concert of Les Misérables at the O2 Arena, which has been seen worldwide on television and released on DVD. Both the 25th and 10th Anniversary concerts have been extensively broadcast by PBS to boost fund-raising efforts.

Abell was music director of the West End production of Andrew Lloyd Webber's Love Never Dies from its opening in March 2010 until March 2011. Between 2011 and 2014, he conducted the French premieres of four Sondheim musicals: Follies at the Opéra de Toulon, Sweeney Todd and Sunday in the Park with George and Into the Woods at the Théâtre du Châtelet in Paris.

Abell conducted London's Laurence Olivier Awards ceremony from 2011 to 2014. He has appeared twice at English National Opera, conducting Sweeney Todd with Bryn Terfel and Emma Thompson in 2015 and Carousel with Alfie Boe and Katherine Jenkins in 2017.

=== Pops career ===
A regular guest conductor with the Philly Pops since his debut in 2013, Abell released a Christmas CD with them in 2015 and was appointed principal guest conductor of the organization in 2017. He served as music director and principal conductor from 2020 to 2023. He made his Boston Pops debut in 2016 with an all-Gershwin concert.

== Music scholarship ==
Abell has helped restore clarity to musical theatre scores affected by accretions of revival productions and poorly preserved source materials, notably West Side Story. Along with pianist and musicologist Seann Alderking, he edited a complete edition of Cole Porter's Kiss Me, Kate, published in 2014. It is one of the first American musicals to be published in a critical edition.

== Career highlights ==
Year	Organization	Title	Notes
2025	Cape Symphony	A New Era concert	Brahms, Saint Saëns, Walker
2025	Curtis Institute of Music	Candide	Curtis Centennial Celebration
2022	Opéra du Rhin	West Side Story	dir. Barrie Kosky
2022	Philly Pops	Hammerstein: The Song Is You	Liz Callaway, soloist
2021	Philly Pops	A Philly Pops Christmas	10-concert series
2021	Lyric Opera of Kansas City	Lyric Opera Goes to Hollywood	dir. Crystal Manich
2020	Atlanta Opera	Porgy and Bess	dir. Francesca Zambello
2020	Kyiv National Academic Theatre of Operetta	A Celebration of George Gershwin	Florian Feilmair, piano
2019	Lyric Opera of Kansas City	La bohème	dir. Kathleen Smith Belcher
2019	Orchestre National Bordeaux Aquitaine	Music of Bernard Herrmann	Festival Ciné-Notes
2018	Hawaii Opera Theatre	Eugene Onegin	dir. Tomer Zvulun
2018	BBC Symphony Orchestra	Bernstein Centenary Concert	including Serenade, Songfest
2017	Opera Philadelphia	Die Zauberflöte	dir. Barrie Kosky
2017	English National Opera	Carousel	with Alfie Boe, Katherine Jenkins
2016	Cincinnati Opera	Die Fledermaus	with Cincinnati Symphony Orchestra
2016	Opera Orlando	One Voice Orlando	Opera gala benefitting Pulse shooting charities
2016	Boston Pops Orchestra	Gershwin Celebration	Boston Pops debut
2015	Opera North	Kiss Me, Kate	based on 2014 Critical Edition
2015	Lyric Opera of Kansas City	Silent Night	with Kansas City Symphony
2014	London Philharmonic Orchestra	Rachmaninoff Piano Concerto No. 2	Live accompaniment to film Brief Encounter
2014	BBC Proms	War Horse Prom	dir. Melly Still
2014	Théâtre du Châtelet	Into the Woods	French premiere
2013	Menier Chocolate Factory	Candide	Musical Supervision
2013	Théâtre du Châtelet	Sunday in the Park with George	French premiere
2013	Opéra de Toulon	Follies	French premiere
2012	Leicester Curve Theatre	Finding Neverland	World Premiere
2012	Cincinnati Opera	Porgy and Bess	dir. Lemuel Wade
2011	Kanagawa Arts Theatre	Pacific Overtures	dir. Amon Miyamoto
2011	Théâtre du Châtelet	Sweeney Todd	French premiere
2010	O2 Arena	Les Misérables	25th Anniversary Concert
2010	BBC Proms	Sondheim at 80	with Judi Dench, Bryn Terfel
2010	Adelphi Theatre	Love Never Dies	World Premiere
2009	Cape Town Opera	Porgy and Bess	UK Tour
2008	Théâtre du Châtelet	On the Town	dir. Jude Kelly
2008	Glimmerglass Opera	Kiss Me, Kate	dir. Diane Paulus
2007	Tokyo International Forum	Take Flight	Asian Premiere
2007	Festival dei Due Mondi	Maria Golovin	dir. Vincent Boussard
2007	The New York Pops	Gala concert	Carnegie Hall debut
2006	Young Vic	Tobias and the Angel	dir. John Fulljames
2006	Royal Albert Hall	Show Boat	dir. Francesca Zambello
2004	Wales Millennium Centre	Grand Opening Concert	dir. Ken Caswell
2004	Tokyo International Forum	Candide	dir. Amon Miyamoto
2003	Bregenz Festival	West Side Story	Floating Stage production
2003	Luglio Musicale Trapanese	Manon Lescaut	dir. Mario Corradi
2002	BBC Proms	Richard Rodgers Centenary Concert	dir. Kenneth Richardson
2000	Theater St. Gallen	The Three Musketeers	World Premiere
1999	Opera North	The Thieving Magpie	dir. Martin Duncan
1998	Royal Albert Hall	Madama Butterfly	dir. David Freeman
1997	Royal Albert Hall	Carmen	dir. Frank Dunlop
1996	Prince Edward Theatre	Martin Guerre	World Premiere
1995	Royal Albert Hall	Les Misérables	10th Anniversary Concert
1991	Théâtre Mogador	Les Misérables	dir. Trevor Nunn & John Caird
1985	New York City Opera	The Mikado	dir. Lotfi Mansouri
1983	Washington Opera	The Turn of the Screw	U.S. conducting debut
1982	Deutschlandhalle	Mass	Professional conducting debut

== Selected discography ==
Year	Title	Label	Notes
2024	State Fair and The 20th Century Fox Songbook	CD: Dutton Vocalion	Michael Feinstein, Scarlett Strallen, Clare Teal, James Taylor (tenor), Derek Greten-Harrison, BBC Concert Orchestra
2014	Something's Gotta Give	CD: Chandos Records	Simon Keenlyside, Scarlett Strallen, BBC Concert Orchestra
2013	Forever	CD: Warner Classics/Erato Records	Diana Damrau, Royal Liverpool Philharmonic
2010	Les Misérables	DVD: Universal Studios	25th Anniversary Concert; Alfie Boe, Nick Jonas, Ramin Karimloo, Lea Salonga
2010	Tobias and the Angel	CD: Chandos Records	World Premiere Recording; James Laing
2005	Strauss: Dance and Dream	DVD: Euroarts	Concert and Docudrama; Wiener Akademie; Lesley Garrett
2004	The Little Prince	CD, DVD: Sony Music	World Premiere Recording; Joseph McManners, Teddy Tahu Rhodes, Lesley Garrett, Willard White, Aled Jones, BBC Concert Orchestra
2002	Richard Rodgers: An Enchanted Evening	DVD: Image Entertainment	Drury Lane Centennial Concert; Judi Dench, Lesley Garrett, Kim Criswell
2000	Man of La Mancha	CD: Jay Records	First Complete Recording; BBC Concert Orchestra; Ron Raines, Kim Criswell
1996	Martin Guerre	CD: First Night Records	World Premiere Recording
1996	Les Misérables	CD: First Night Records; DVD: BBC Video	10th Anniversary Concert; Royal Philharmonic Orchestra; Colm Wilkinson, Philip Quast, Michael Ball, Alun Armstrong, Ruthie Henshall
1996	La bohème (selections); Madama Butterfly (selections)	CD: Tring Records	Royal Philharmonic Orchestra; Claire Rutter, Paul Charles Clarke, Stephen Gadd
1994	Miss Saigon	CD: First Night Records	Complete International Symphonic Cast Recording; Joanna Ampil, Peter Cousens, Kevin Gray, Hinton Battle, Ruthie Henshall
1992	Les Misérables	CD: Disques Tréma	Paris Cast Recording; Robert Marien, Louise Pitre, Jérôme Pradon, Stephanie Martin
