= Philly Pops =

American orchestra based in Philadelphia

Coordinates: 39.94674°N 75.16588°W

The Philly Pops
- Orchestra
- Founded: 1979; 47 years ago
- Principal conductor: David Charles Abell
- Music director: David Charles Abell
- Website: www.phillypops.org

The Philly Pops is an American orchestra that is based in Philadelphia, Pennsylvania.

== History ==
Founded by presenter and producer, Moe Septee, and conducted from 1979 to 2013 by two-time Grammy Award-winning pianist Peter Nero, the Philly Pops plays orchestral versions of popular jazz, swing, Broadway songs and blues. David Charles Abell took over the positions of principal conductor and music director in 2020.

On October 4, 1999, the Philly Pops was designated as the official pops orchestra of the Commonwealth of Pennsylvania.

The Philly Pops will cease operations after the 2022-2023 season. In 2023, former financial controller for the Philly Pops, Cheryl Lutts, was convicted of embezzling more than $280,000 from the organization, starting when she was hired in 2019.

The musicians of the Philly Pops have organized into the recently formed No Name Pops to continue the musical tradition of the Philly Pops.

== Notable Members ==
- Peter Nero
- David Charles Abell
- John Thyhsen
