= Peter Nero =

American pianist and pops conductor (1934–2023)

Background information
- Born: Bernard Nierow; May 22, 1934; New York, New York, U.S.
- Died: July 6, 2023 (aged 89) Eustis, Florida, U.S.
- Occupations: Musician, conductor
- Instrument: Piano
- Website: www.peternero.com

Peter Nero (born Bernard Nierow; May 22, 1934 – July 6, 2023) was an American pianist and Pops conductor. He directed the Philly Pops from 1979 to 2013, and earned two Grammy Awards, including the award for Best New Artist in 1962, as well as a total of 8 nominations.

== Early life ==
Born in New York, New York, as Bernard Nierow, he started his formal music training at the age of seven. He studied piano under Frederick Bried. By the time he was 14, he was accepted to New York City's High School of Music & Art and won a scholarship to the Juilliard School of Music, where he later studied part-time. He took private lessons from Abram Chasins and Constance Keene. Keene once wrote in an issue of Keyboard Classics "Vladimir Horowitz was Peter's greatest fan!" He graduated from Brooklyn College in 1956 with a bachelor's degree in psychology.

== Career ==
Nero made his television debut at the age of 17, playing "Rhapsody in Blue" on a special hosted by Paul Whiteman. He recorded his first album under the name of Bernie Nerow in July 1957 on the Mode label (MOD-LP117), which shows his technical virtuosity in the jazz genre. Nero recorded Piano Forte in 1961, and won a Grammy Award in 1961 for Best New Artist. The next year, he won the Grammy for Best Performance By An Orchestra Or Instrumentalist With Orchestra - Primarily Not Jazz Or For Dancing for his album The Colorful Peter Nero. Since then, he has garnered 10 additional nominations and released 67 albums. Nero's early association with RCA Victor produced 23 albums in eight years. His subsequent move to Columbia Records resulted in the million-selling single and album Summer of '42.

His first major national TV success came at the age of 17, when he was chosen to perform Gershwin's Rhapsody in Blue on Paul Whiteman's TV special. He subsequently appeared on many top variety and talk shows, including 11 guest appearances on The Ed Sullivan Show and numerous appearances on The Tonight Show Starring Johnny Carson.

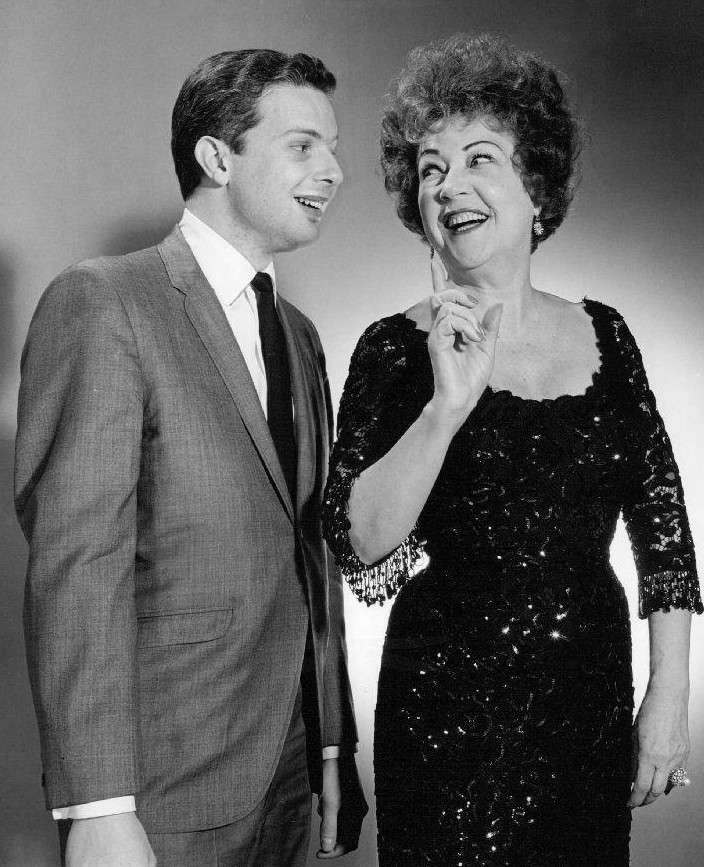
Nero and Ethel Merman on The Bell Telephone Hour in 1964.

Hailed as one of the premier interpreters of George Gershwin, Nero starred in the Emmy Award-winning S'Wonderful, S'Marvelous, S'Gershwin (1972). Other TV credits included performances on PBS-TV's Piano Pizzazz and with the National Symphony in Washington, D.C., on its July 4 special titled A Capitol Fourth. Nero served as music director and pianist for the PBS-TV special The Songs of Johnny Mercer: Too Marvelous for Words (1997) with co-stars Johnny Mathis, Melissa Manchester and many members of The POPS.

In 1963, Nero composed and performed the musical score for the motion picture Sunday in New York. The title song, which was sung by Mel Torme, has been recorded by over two dozen vocalists, and the score was nominated for both a Golden Globe and Hollywood Reporter Award. He also made an appearance in the film (playing himself) which co-starred Jane Fonda, Rod Taylor, Robert Culp, and Cliff Robertson. In the film, Jane Fonda's character gave her brother (played by Robertson) a Nero recording.

Nero worked with notable musicians, including Frank Sinatra, Mel Torme, Arthur Fiedler, Andy Williams, Ray Charles, Dizzy Gillespie, Diane Schuur, Johnny Mathis, Roger Kellaway and Elton John.

Nero was the founding music director of Peter Nero and the Philly Pops, which he led from 1979 to 2013.

From 1990 to 1999, Nero was also Pops Music Director of the Florida Philharmonic Orchestra, conducting and performing with his jazz trio throughout Southeastern Florida.

Nero's recordings included albums with symphony orchestras: On My Own, Classical Connections and My Way. He recorded Peter Nero and Friends, on which collaborated with Mel Torme, Maureen McGovern, Doc Severinsen and others. Nero's last albums Love Songs for a Rainy Day and More in Love focused on romantic themes. By popular demand, four of his earlier recordings were reissued. He appeared on Rod Stewart's album As Time Goes By: The Great American Songbook, Volume II. He released over 60 albums in his career.

== Discography ==
=== Studio albums ===
- Bernie Nerow Trio (Mode Records, 1957)
- Young And Warm And Wonderful (RCA Victor, 1961)
- Piano Forte (RCA Victor, 1961)
- New Piano In Town (orchestra conducted by Marty Gold) (RCA Victor, 1961)
- The Colorful Peter Nero (RCA Victor, 1962)
- For The Nero-Minded (RCA Victor, 1962)
- Hail The Conquering Nero (RCA Victor, 1963)
- Sunday In New York (RCA Victor, 1964)
- Peter Nero Plays Songs You Won't Forget (RCA Victor, 1964)
- Reflections (RCA Victor, 1964)
- Peter Nero Plays Gershwin (RCA Victor, 1965)
- Career Girls (RCA Victor, 1965)
- The Screen Scene (RCA Victor, 1966)
- Peter Nero Plays Born Free And Others (RCA Camden, 1966)
- Up Close (RCA Victor, 1966)
- Xochimilco (RCA Victor, 1967)
- Plays A Salute To Herb Alpert & The Tijuana Brass (RCA Victor, 1967)
- Nero-Ing In On The Hits (RCA Victor, 1967)
- Peter Nero Plays Love Is Blue (RCA Victor, 1967)
- If Ever I Would Leave You (RCA Camden, 1968)
- Impressions (The Great Songs Of Burt Bacharach & Hal David) (RCA Victor, 1968)
- I've Gotta Be Me (Columbia Records, 1969)
- Love Trip (RCA Victor, 1969)
- Peter Nero (RCA Camden, 1970)
- I’ll Never Fall In Love Again (Columbia Records, 1970)
- Peter Nero Summer of 42 (Columbia Records, 1971)
- Plays Music from Great Motion Pictures (RCA Camden, 1972)

=== Collaborative albums ===
- With Frankie Carle, Floyd Cramer, 3 Great Pianos (RCA, 1963)
- With Arthur Fiedler and The Boston Pops Orchestra, Nero Goes "Pops" (RCA Victor Red Seal, 1965)
- With Arthur Fiedler and The Boston Pops Orchestra, Gershwin – Fantasy And Improvisations (First Recording) / Concerto In F (RCA Victor Red Seal, 1968)

=== Live albums ===
- In Person (RCA Victor, 1963)
- Peter Nero On Tour (RCA Victor, 1966)

== Personal life and death ==
Nero was married and divorced three times. His first wife was childhood sweetheart Marcia Dunner, with whom he had two children, Beverly and Jedd, and three grandchildren: Robert, Nicole and Gordon. Nero died of natural causes at an assisted living facility in Eustis, Florida, on July 6, 2023, at the age of 89.

== Awards and honors ==
In addition to the two Grammy Awards, Nero's honors included six honorary doctorates, the most recent from Drexel University in 2004, and the International Society of Performing Arts Presenters Award for Excellence in the Arts. He was also included on historic Walks of Fame in Philadelphia and Miami, Florida. In 1999, he received the Pennsylvania Distinguished Arts Award from Pennsylvania Governor Tom Ridge; previous honorees include Marian Anderson, James Michener, Andrew Wyeth and Riccardo Muti. In 2009, Nero was awarded the Lifetime Achievement Award from the American Federation of Musicians.
