= Ecbatana =

Ancient city, capital of the Median Empire

- Hagmatana (Old Persian)
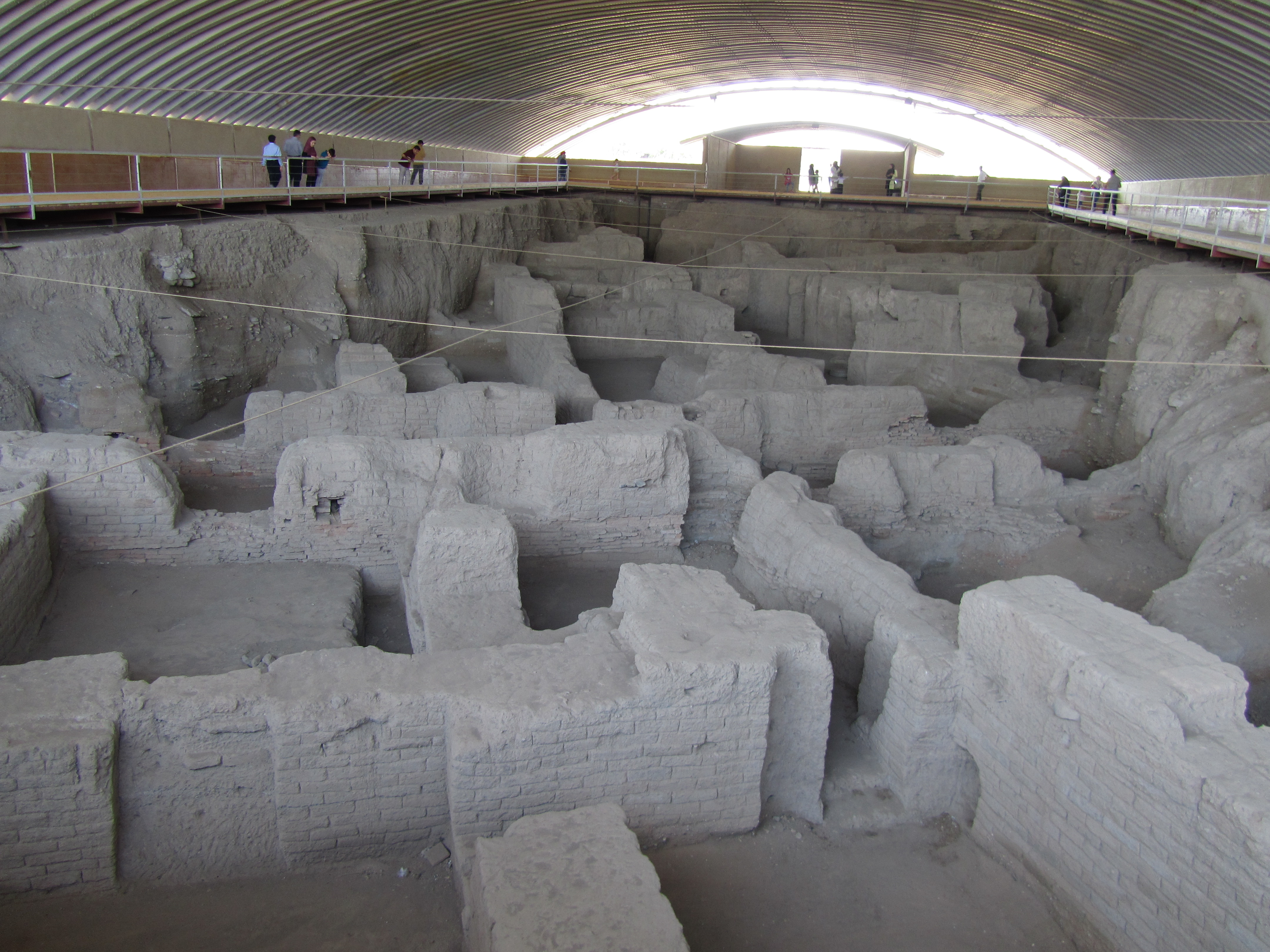
- Archeological site of Ecbatana in 2017

- Location within Iran Location within Near East
- 34°48′23″N 48°30′58″E
- Type: Settlement
- Periods: Median kingdom; Achaemenid Empire; Parthian Empire; Seleucid Empire; Sasanian Empire
- Cultures: Persian
- Location: Hamadan, Hamadan province, Iran
- Region: Zagros Mountains

History
- Built: 11th century BC
- Built by: Deioces
- Abandoned: 1220
- Event: Battle of Ecbatana

Site notes
- Condition: In ruins
- Management: Cultural Heritage, Handicrafts and Tourism Organization of Iran
- Public access: Open

UNESCO World Heritage Site
- Criteria: ii, iii
- Reference: 1716
- Inscription: 2024 (46th Session)
- Area: 75 ha (0.29 sq mi)
- Buffer zone: 287 ha (1.11 sq mi)

Iran National Heritage List
- Official name: Ecbatana
- Type: Archaeological Site
- Designated: 1931
- Reference no.: 28
- Conservation organization: Cultural Heritage, Handicrafts and Tourism Organization of Iran

Ecbatana (Note: Old Persian: 𐏃𐎥𐎶𐎫𐎠𐎴, romanized: Hagmatāna or Haŋmatāna, literally "the place of gathering" according to Darius the Great's inscription at Bisotun; Persian: هگمتانه; Middle Persian: 𐭠𐭧𐭬𐭲𐭠𐭭; Parthian: 𐭀𐭇𐭌𐭕𐭍, romanized: Ahmadān; Late Babylonian Akkadian: 𒆳𒀀𒃵𒋫𒉡, romanized: ᴷᵁᴿAgamtanu; Elamite: 𒀝𒈠𒆪𒈾, romanized: Agmadana; Imperial Aramaic: 𐡀𐡇𐡌𐡕𐡀, romanized: Aḥməṯā; Ancient Greek: Ἀγβάτανα or Ἐκβάτανα) (/ɛkˈbætənə/) was an ancient city, the capital of the Median kingdom, and the first capital in Iranian history. It later became the summer capital of the Achaemenid and Parthian empires. It was also an important city during the Seleucid and Sasanian empires. Ecbatana was located in the Zagros Mountains, the east of central Mesopotamia, on Hagmatana Hill (Tappe-ye Hagmatāna). Its strategic location and resources probably made it a popular site even before the 1st millennium BC. It is identified with the current city of Hamadan.

== History ==
=== Median kingdom (678–550 BC) ===
According to Herodotus, Ecbatana was chosen as the Medes' capital in 678 BC by Deioces, the first ruler of the Medes. Herodotus said that it had seven walls. Deioces's intention was to build a palace worthy of the dignity of a king. After choosing Ecbatana as his capital, Deioces decided to build a huge and strong palace in the form of seven nested castles. Herodotus says that each of them was in the color of a planet. The royal palace and the treasury were located inside the seventh castle. The outer perimeter of the castle wall was almost the size of the city wall of Athens.

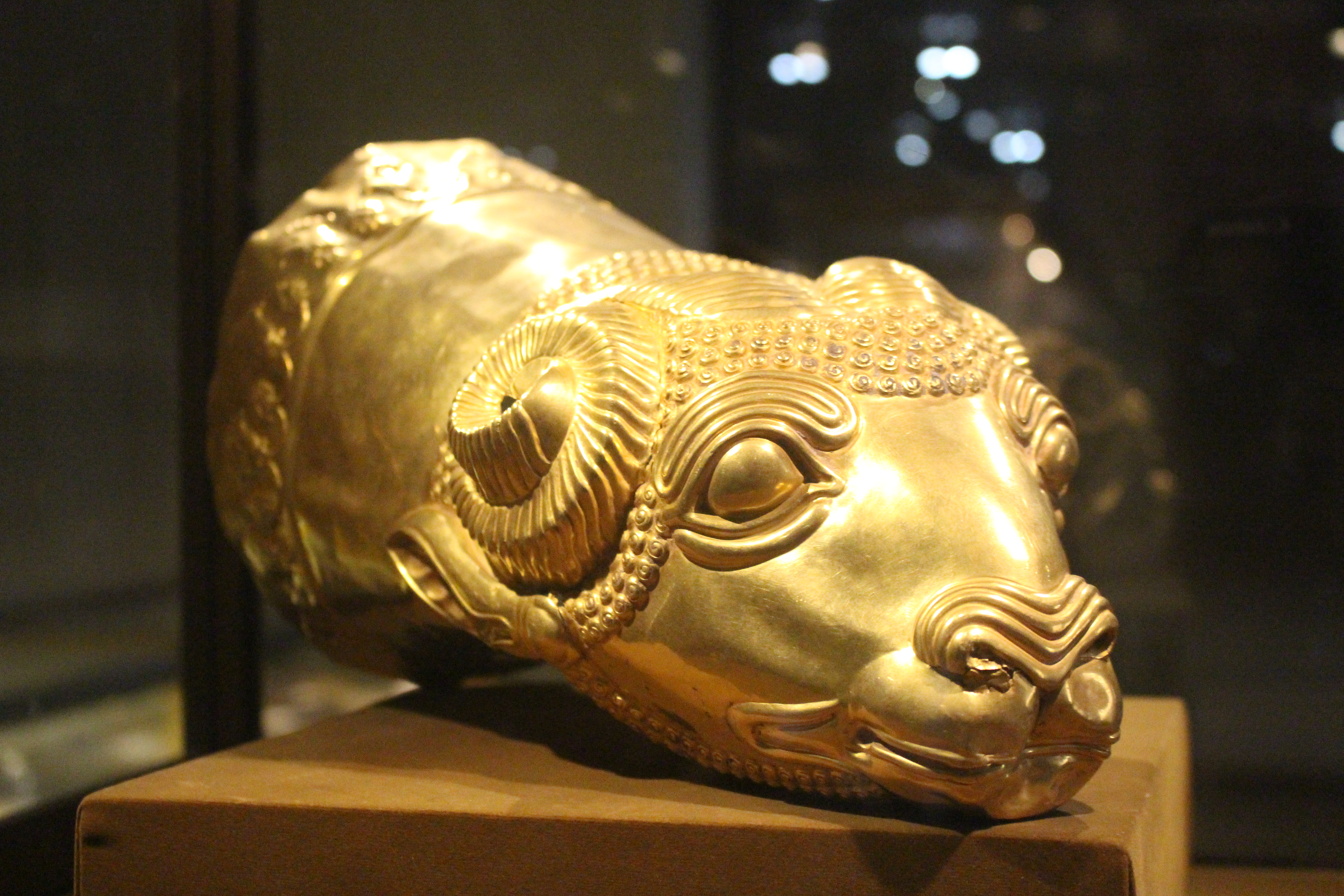
Golden rhyton of ram's head, discovered in Ecbatana, kept at the Reza Abbasi Museum

The royal palace, which was built in the last inner fort, had hundreds of rooms and people also built their houses outside of these forts, next to the palace. Some archaeologists have also attributed its construction to Phraortes, the second king of the Medes. Other old legends attribute the origin of Ecbatana to the legendary Semiramis or Jamshid. Ecbatana has also been mentioned by other Greek historians such as Polybius, Ctesias, Justin, and Xenophon. The Assyrians do not seem to mention Ecbatana, and it is likely they never penetrated east of the Alvand despite two centuries of involvement in Median areas of the central Zagros.

=== Achaemenid Empire (550–330 BC) ===
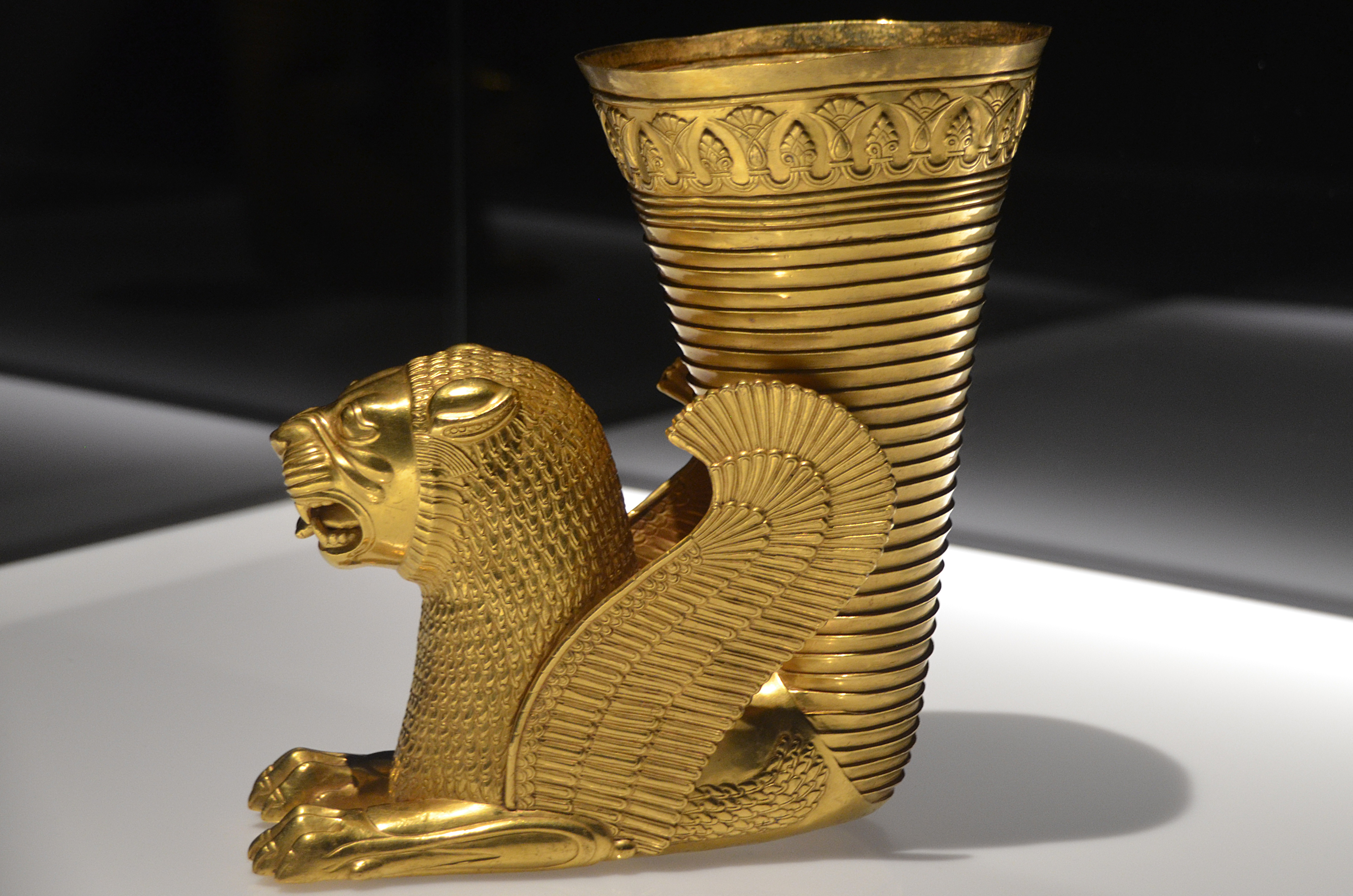
Achaemenid golden rhyton in the shape of a lion, from Ecbatana, kept at the National Museum of Iran

In 550 BC, Cyrus the Great defeated Astyages and conquered Ecbatana, forming the Achaemenid Empire. Although Ecbatana lost its former importance, it was located on the royal road, where it connected Persepolis to Sardis, and situated at the foot of Mount Alvand. So it was settled by the Achaemenid rulers. The city became the summer capital and a treasury of the Achaemenids. As mentioned in several sources, the city was also used as a royal archive.

In ancient times, Ecbatana was renowned for its wealth and splendid architecture. In 330 BC when Darius III faced Alexander, Ecbatana was in ruins, but Darius III ordered the construction of hundreds of hiding places in the middle of the city for treasures and assets. Some weeks before Darius III was killed in a coup in July 330 BC, Ecbatana was conquered, and Persepolis destroyed by Alexander. These events marked the end of the Achaemenid Empire.

=== Seleucid Empire (312–63 BC) ===
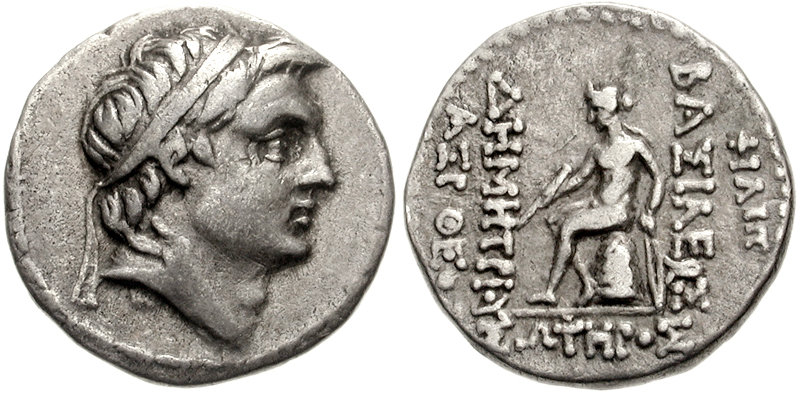
Coin of Demetrius I, minted and discovered in Ecbatana.

In 330 BC, Alexander the Great captured the treasury of Ecbatana, and he looted all the gold and silver decorations of the palace. Ecbatana was the site of the assassination of the Macedonian general Parmenion by Alexander's order.

Later, in 305 BC, the city was ruled by Seleucus I. Demetrius I Soter maintained a mint in Ecbatana during his reign 162 BC to 150 BC.

=== Parthian Empire (247 BC – AD 224) ===
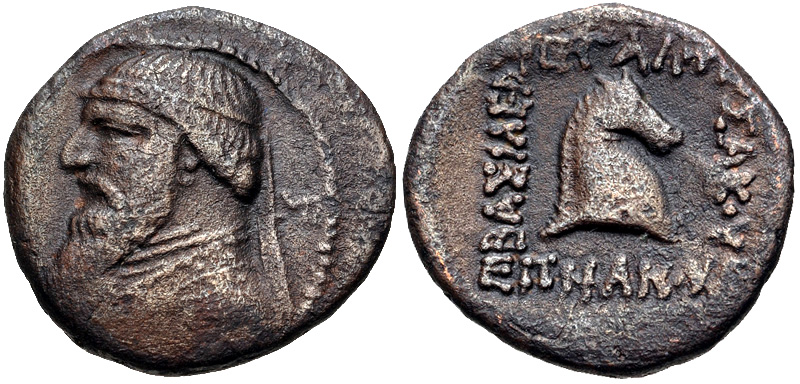
Coin of Mithridates II with a horse depicted on reverse, minted and discovered in Ecbatana.

Ecbatana later became the summer capital of the Parthians, and their main mint, producing drachms, tetradrachms, and assorted bronze denominations.

The wealth and importance of the city during classical antiquity are attributed to its location, a crucial crossroads that made it a staging post on the main east–west highway called High-Road. There was a reputation for horses and wheat in the area (Polybius, 5.44.1). Graphite, gold, platinum, antimony, iron, and various minerals are found there; however, the classics mention oil seeps and flares, and there is no evidence of exploitation of these resources.

=== Sasanian Empire (AD 224–651) ===
Ecbatana remained loyal to the Parthians until AD 226, when Ardashir I defeated Artabanus IV and conquered Ecbatana from the north, alongside Atropatene. There is conflicting evidence as to whether Ecbatana was used as the summer capital for Sasanians or not. According to Ibn al-Faqih, buildings were built between Ctesiphon (The Sassanid capital) and Mount Alvand, but not beyond that.

=== Destruction ===
After the battle of Nahavand in 642 AD, Ecbatana fell to the Muslims, and around 1220, the city was completely destroyed by the Mongol invasion. Ecbatana was sacked in 1386 by Timur, and the population was slaughtered as a result.

=== Historical descriptions ===
==== Herodotus's description ====
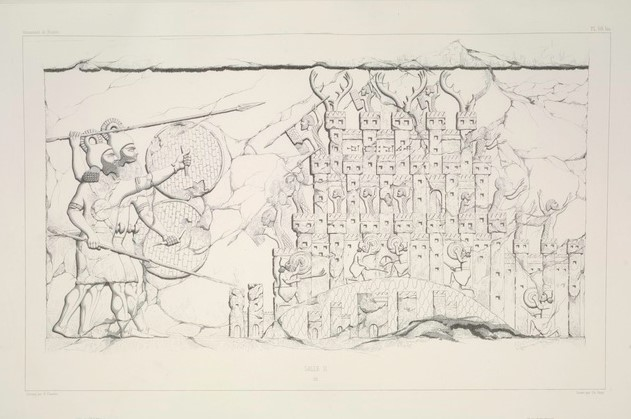
Assyrian-era relief of a Median city built with walls forming concentric circles on a hill, similarly to how Greek authors later described Ecbatana.

The Greeks thought Ecbatana to be the capital of the Median empire and credited its foundation to Deioces (the Daiukku of the cuneiform inscriptions). It is alleged that he surrounded his palace in Ecbatana with seven concentric walls of different colors. There are some indications that the walls of this complex might be an ancient ziggurat, which was a type of temple tower with multiple stories that were common in the ancient Near East.

In the 5th century BC, Herodotus wrote of Ecbatana:

"The Medes built the city now called Ecbatana, the walls of which are of great size and strength, rising in circles one within the other. The plan of the place is, that each of the walls should out-top the one beyond it by the battlements. The nature of the ground, which is a gentle hill, favors this arrangements in some degree but it is mainly effected by art. The number of the circles is seven, the royal palace and the treasuries standing within the last. The circuit of the outer wall is very nearly the same with that of Athens. On this wall the battlements are white, of the next black, of the third scarlet, of the fourth blue, the fifth orange; all these colors with paint. The last two have their battlements coated respectively with silver and gold. All these fortifications Deioces had caused to be raised for himself and his own palace."

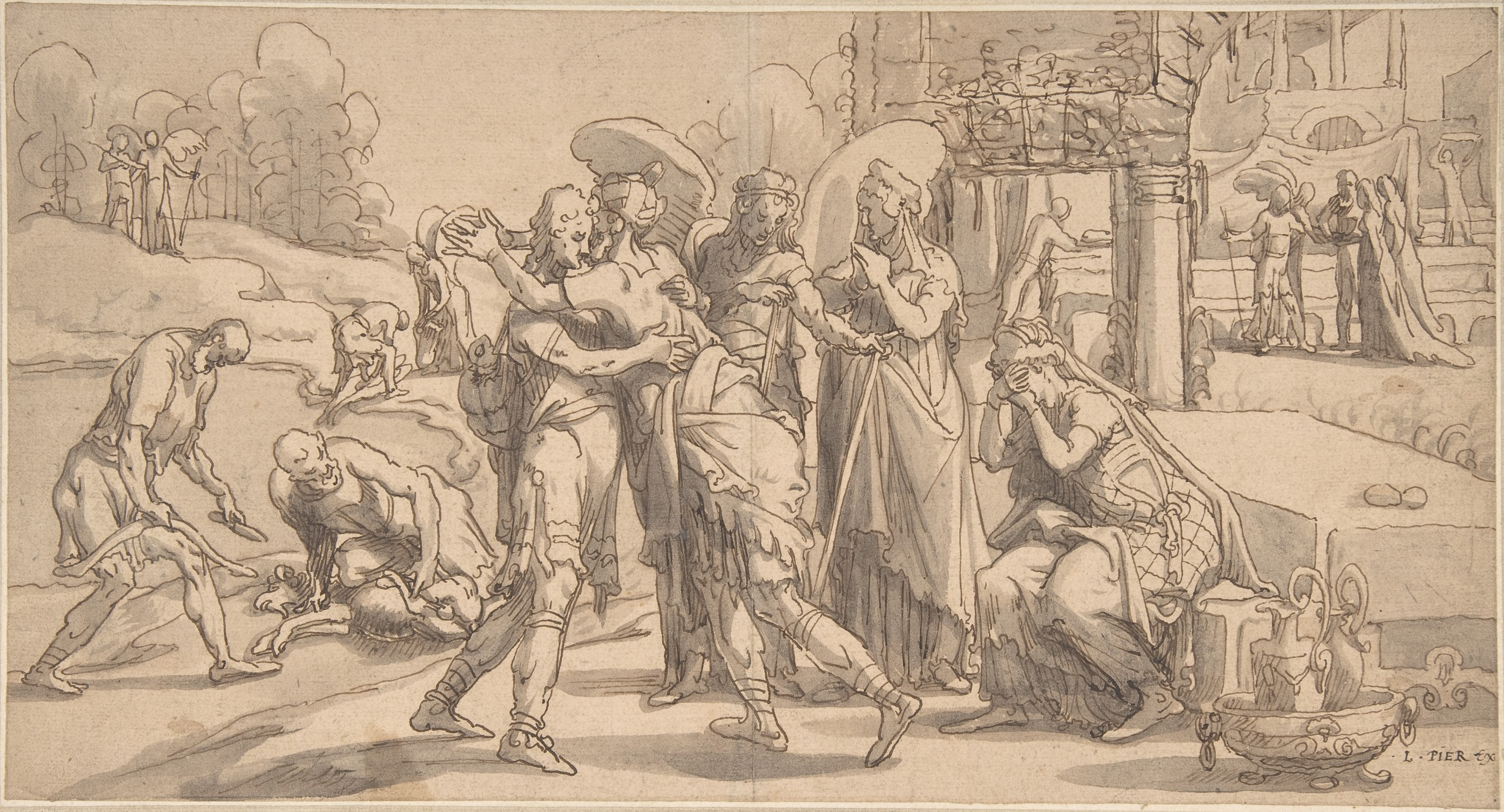
Raquel's reception of Tobias at Ecbatana

Herodotus's description is corroborated in part by stone reliefs from the Neo-Assyrian Empire, depicting Median citadels ringed by concentric walls. Other sources attest to the historical importance of Ecbatana based on the terms used by ancient authors to describe it such as Caput Mediae (capital of Media), the Royal Seat, and the Great City. It is said that Alexander the Great deposited the treasures he took from Persepolis and Pasargadae and that one of the last acts of his life was to visit the city.

The citadel of Ecbatana is also mentioned in the Bible in Ezra 6:2, in the time of Darius I, as part of the national archives.

==== Description in the Chronicle of Nabonidus ====
The Nabonidus Chronicle, an ancient Babylonian text from the 5th century BC, describes how Astyages, the last Median king, was dethroned and how Cyrus conquered Ecbatana.

"King Astyages called up his troops and marched against Cyrus, king of Anšan [i.e., Persis], in order to meet him in battle. The army of Astyages revolted against him and delivered him in fetters to Cyrus. Cyrus marched against the country of Ecbatana; the royal residence he seized; silver, gold, other valuables of the country Ecbatana he took as booty and brought to Anšan."

==== Polybius of Megalopolis's description ====
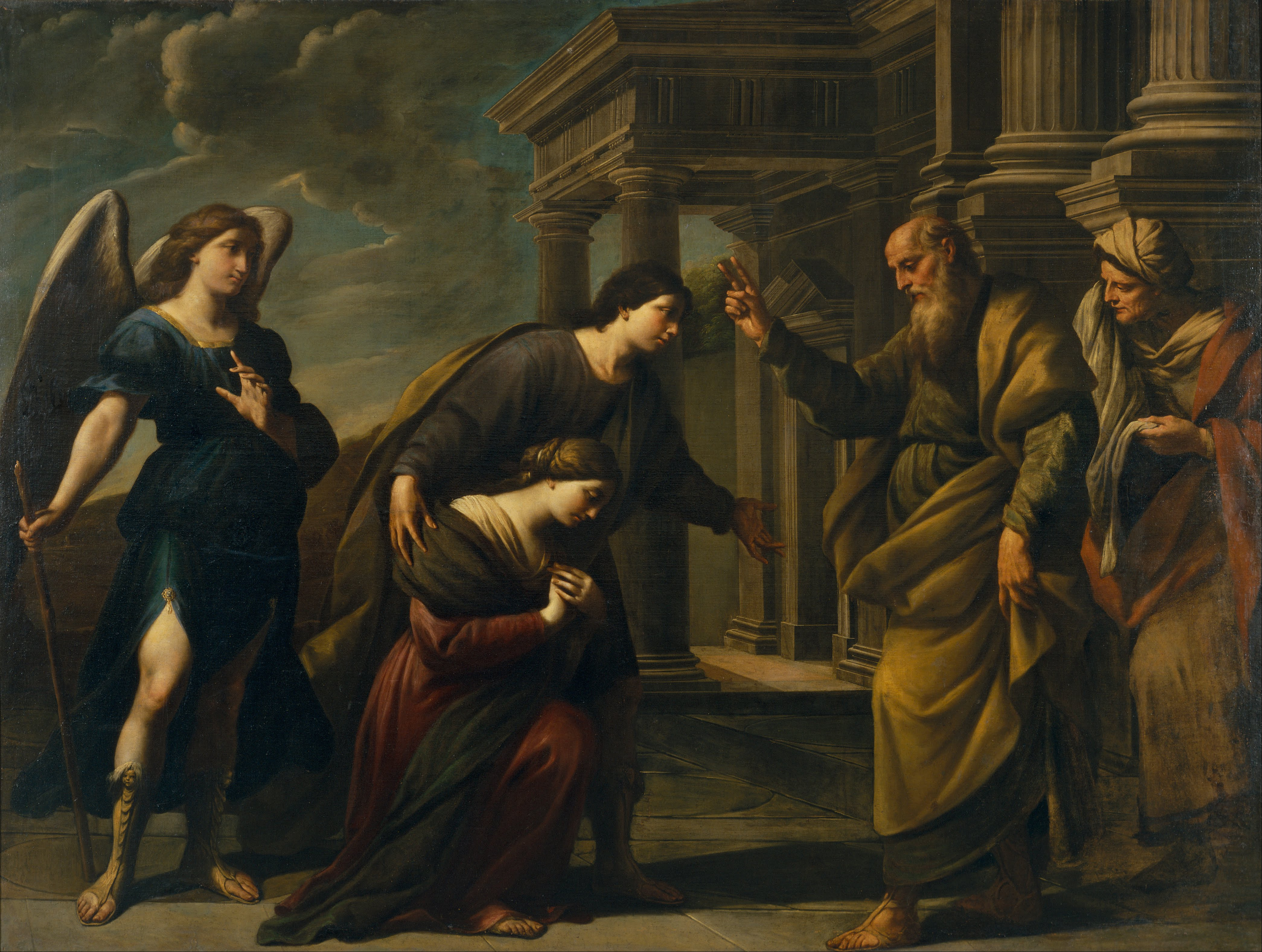
Raguel's Blessing of her Daughter Sarah before Leaving Ecbatana with Tobias, by Andrea Vaccaro

In the 2nd century BC, Polybius writes about Ecbatana. He mentions that the wealth and magnificence of its buildings make it stand out among all other cities. It has no walls but an artificial citadel with amazing fortifications. Underneath this is the palace which is about seven stories in circumference, and its magnificence shows the wealth of its founders. During his time, no parts of the woodwork were left exposed. There were silver or gold-plated rafters, compartments in the ceiling, and columns in the porticos and colonnades, and silver tiles were used throughout the structure. In the invasion by Alexander, most precious metals were stripped, while the remainder were stripped during Antigonus's and Seleucus's reigns. However, Antiochus found that the columns of the temple of Aene were still gilded and that several silver tiles were piled up around the temple along with some gold bricks (Polybius, 10.27).

== Archaeology ==
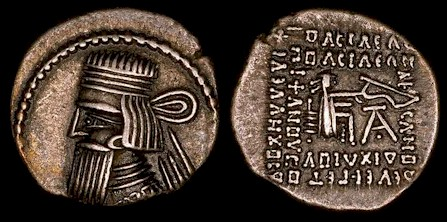
Artabanus II

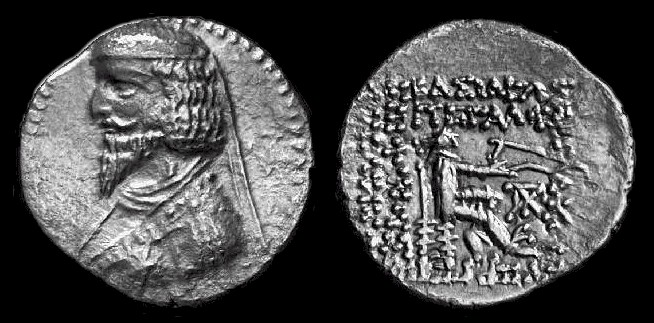
Phraates III

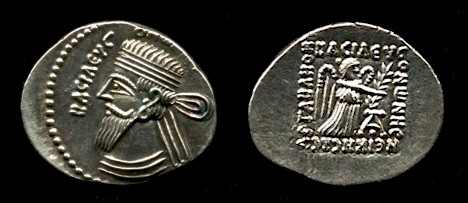
Vonones I

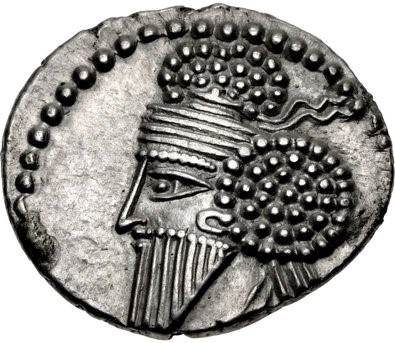
Osroes I

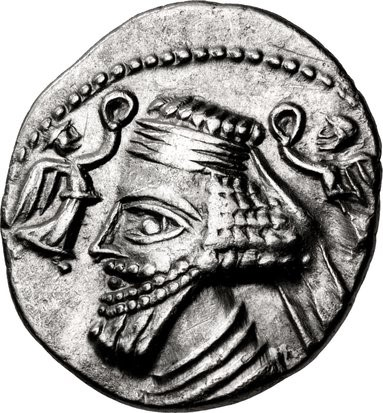
Phraates V

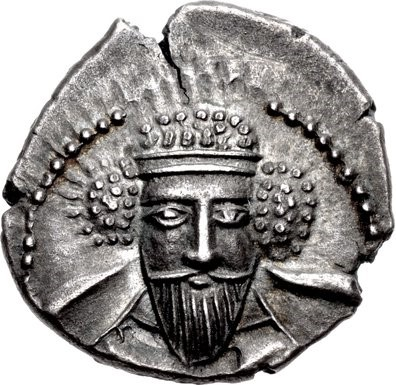
Vologases V

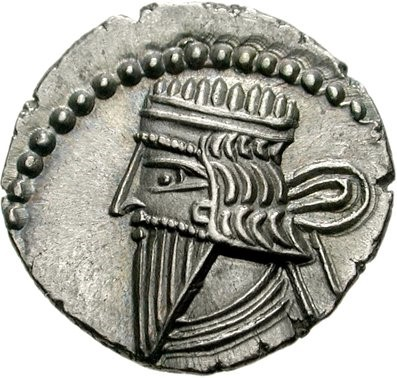
Mithridates V

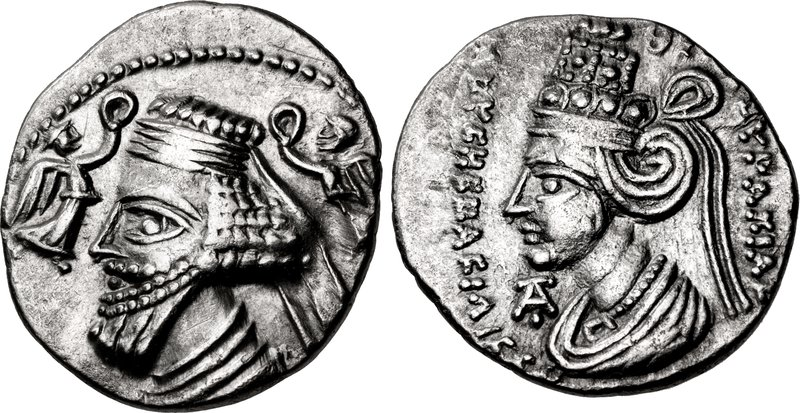
Phraates V and his mother Musa

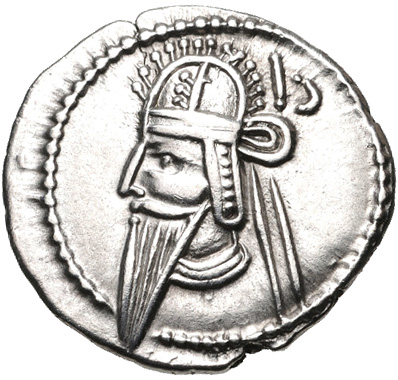
Vologases VI

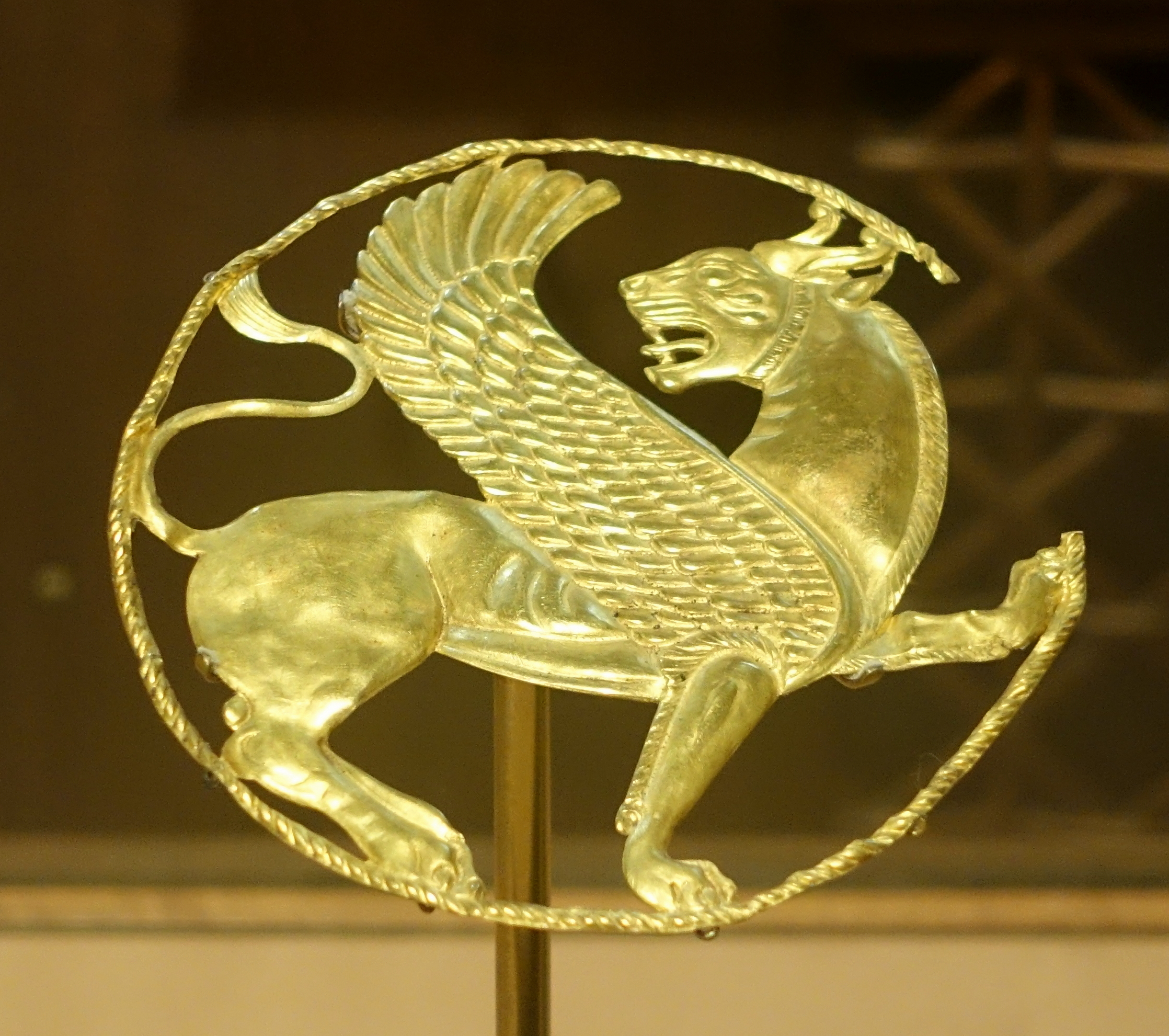
Roundel with winged lion, Achaemenid gold

Topographically, Hamadan is characterized by three hills, Mosalla (place of prayer), Tell Hagmatana (Tappa-ye Hagmatana), Sang-e Sir, and the Alusjerd river, which flows from north to south, separates the city into two parts.

The summit of the Moṣallā, an 80 m (260 ft)-high rock hill in the southeast sector, contains stone and brick remnants of a rectangular citadel marked by towers. It is believed to be the Median citadel, which dates back no earlier than the Parthian era.

The Tell Hagmatana, also called Tepe Hegmataneh (thought to correspond to the ancient citadel of Ecbatana) has a circumference of 1.4 km (0.87 mi) and an area of about 40 hectares, which corresponds to a report from Polybius, although the ancient Greek and Roman accounts likely exaggerate Ecbatana's wealth, splendor, and extravagance.

Relatively few finds thus far can be firmly dated to the Median era. There is a "small, open-sided room with four corner columns supporting a domed ceiling, similar to a Median-era structure from Tepe Nush-i Jan, interpreted as a Zoroastrian fire temple. Excavations have revealed a massive defensive wall made of mud-bricks, and dated to the Median period based on a comparison to Tepe Nush-i Jan and Godin Tepe. There are also two column bases from the Achaemenid period, and some mud-brick structures thought to be from the Median or Achaemenid periods. A badly damaged stone lion sculpture is of disputed date: it may be Achaemenid or Parthian. Numerous Parthian-era constructions attest to Ecbatana's status as a summer capital for the Parthian rulers. In 2006, excavations in a limited area of Hagmatana hill failed to discover anything older than the Parthian period, but this does not rule out older archaeological layers existing elsewhere within the 35-hectare site.

Ecbatana was first excavated in 1913 by Charles Fossey. Fossey discovered fragments of column bases adorned with arabesques and inscriptions, glazed bricks, and faience tiles during the course of the six-week excavation of Mosalla. Based on his chance discoveries, it looks like the 30 m (98 ft)-high mound, Tell Hagmatana, is the site of the Median citadel and the Achaemenid royal construction. The sculptured head of a prince was found during the three months-long excavation of the eastern section.

Excavations have been limited due to the modern town covering most of the ancient site. In 1969, the Ministry of Culture and Art began buying property on the tell in support of archaeology, though excavation did not begin until 1983. By 2007, 12 seasons of excavation had occurred. In 1974, the Iranian Centre for Archeological Research performed some excavation in the Parthian cemetery located at southeast of Hamedan. The work on the tell is ongoing.

== Ecbatana/Hagmatana ==
Historians and archaeologists now believe "the identification of Ecbatana with Hamadān is secure." Earlier, a lack of significant archaeological remains from the Median and Achaemenid periods had prompted suggestions of other sites for Ecbatana.

Assyrian sources never mention Hagmatana/Ecbatana. Some scholars believed the problem can be resolved by identifying the Ecbatana/Hagmatana mentioned in later Greek and Achaemenid sources with the city Sagbita/Sagbat frequently mentioned in Assyrian texts, since the Indo-Iranian sound /s/ became /h/ in many Iranian languages. The Sagbita mentioned by Assyrian sources was located in the proximity of the cities Kishesim (Kar-Nergal) and Harhar (Kar-Sharrukin).

It is now proposed that the absence of any mention of Ecbatana in Assyrian sources can be explained by the possibility that Assyria never became involved as far east as the Alvand mountains, but only in the western Zagros.

Sir Henry Rawlinson attempted to prove that there was a second and older Ecbatana in Media Atropatene on the site of the modern Takht-i-Suleiman. However, the cuneiform texts imply that there was only one city of the name, and that Takht-i Suleiman is the Gazaca of classical geography. There is also the claim that Ecbatana used to be the city of Tabriz, which is one of the historical capitals of Iran and the present capital of East Azerbaijan province. The city, which was previously called Tauris, was put forward by Giovanni Tommaso Minadoi, who cited that his identification of the city was based on data collected from modern and ancient geographers, recent travel accounts, and local informants. This theory was also promoted by other historians, such as Sir William Jones and the chief French orientalists.

Ecbatana is the supposed capital of Astyages (Istuvegü), which was taken by the Persian emperor Cyrus the Great in the sixth year of the reign of Nabonidus (550/549 BC).

== Ecbatana Museum ==
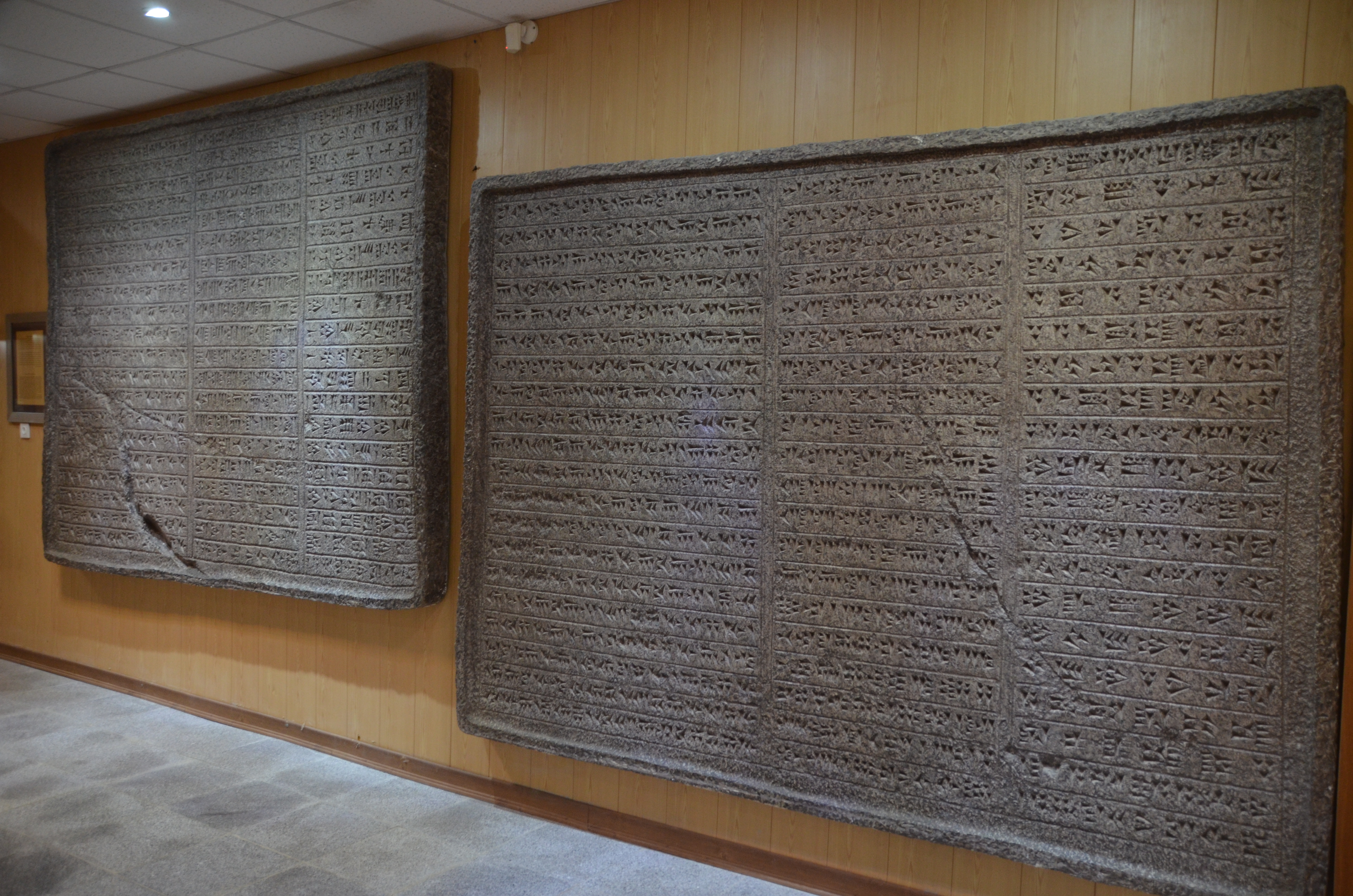
Two Achaemenid cuneiform inscriptions, kept at the Ecbatana Museum

Ecbatana Museum was opened in 1994. The museum is open all days of the week except Monday evening. Located in the east of Ecbatana hill, the museum building used to be a nursery school, but it has been put into changes and repairs to create a temporary museum. With an area of over 600 square meters, a significant amount of the findings from Ecbatana are kept at this museum today, with some others at the National Museum of Iran and Reza Abbasi Museum.

== Noushijan fire temple ==
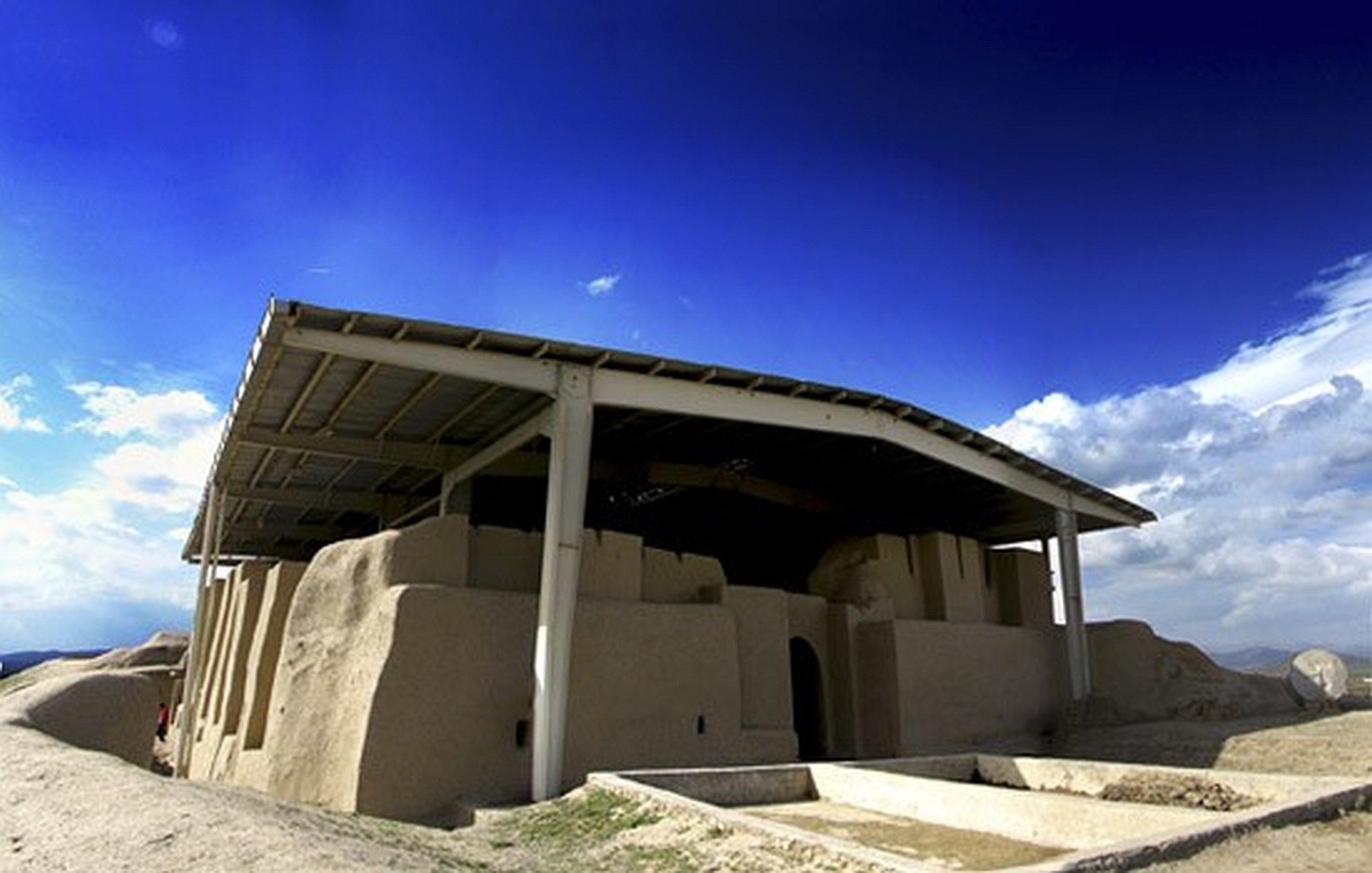
The Noushijan Fire Temple, near Ecbatana

The Noushijan fire temple is one of the most important and oldest fire temples in the world, which is near Ecbatana. It is also the oldest adobe temple in the world. In 1967, the excavations of this place began under the supervision of David Stronach, which led to the identification of three historical periods in three separate floors. The third floor belongs to the Parthians, the second floor belongs to the Achaemenids, and the first floor belongs to the Medes. This place was the most important fire temple of the Medes from the second half of the 8th century to the first half of the 6th century BC, and it is now one of the most important structures left from the time of the Medes.

== In popular culture ==
Archibald MacLeish's poem "You, Andrew Marvell" mentions Ecbatana (as 'Ecbatan') in its catalogue of fallen empires:

...Upon those under lands the vast
And ever climbing shadow grow

And strange at Ecbatan the trees
Take leaf by leaf the evening strange
The flooding dark about their knees
The mountains over Persia change...

MacLeish's poem in turn provides the title of Michael Bishop's novel And Strange at Ecbatan the Trees.

== Gallery ==
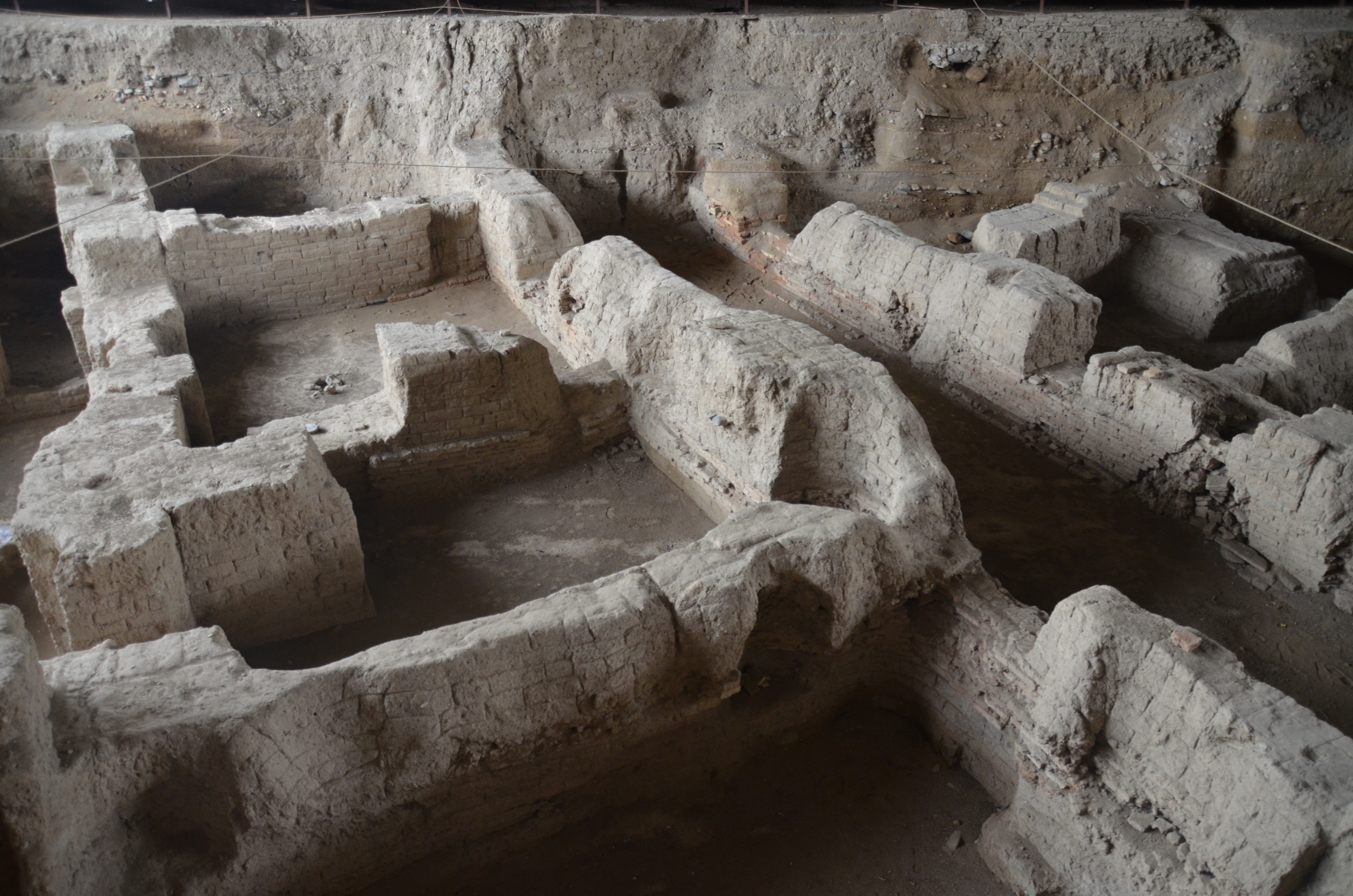
Details of Ecbatana (1)

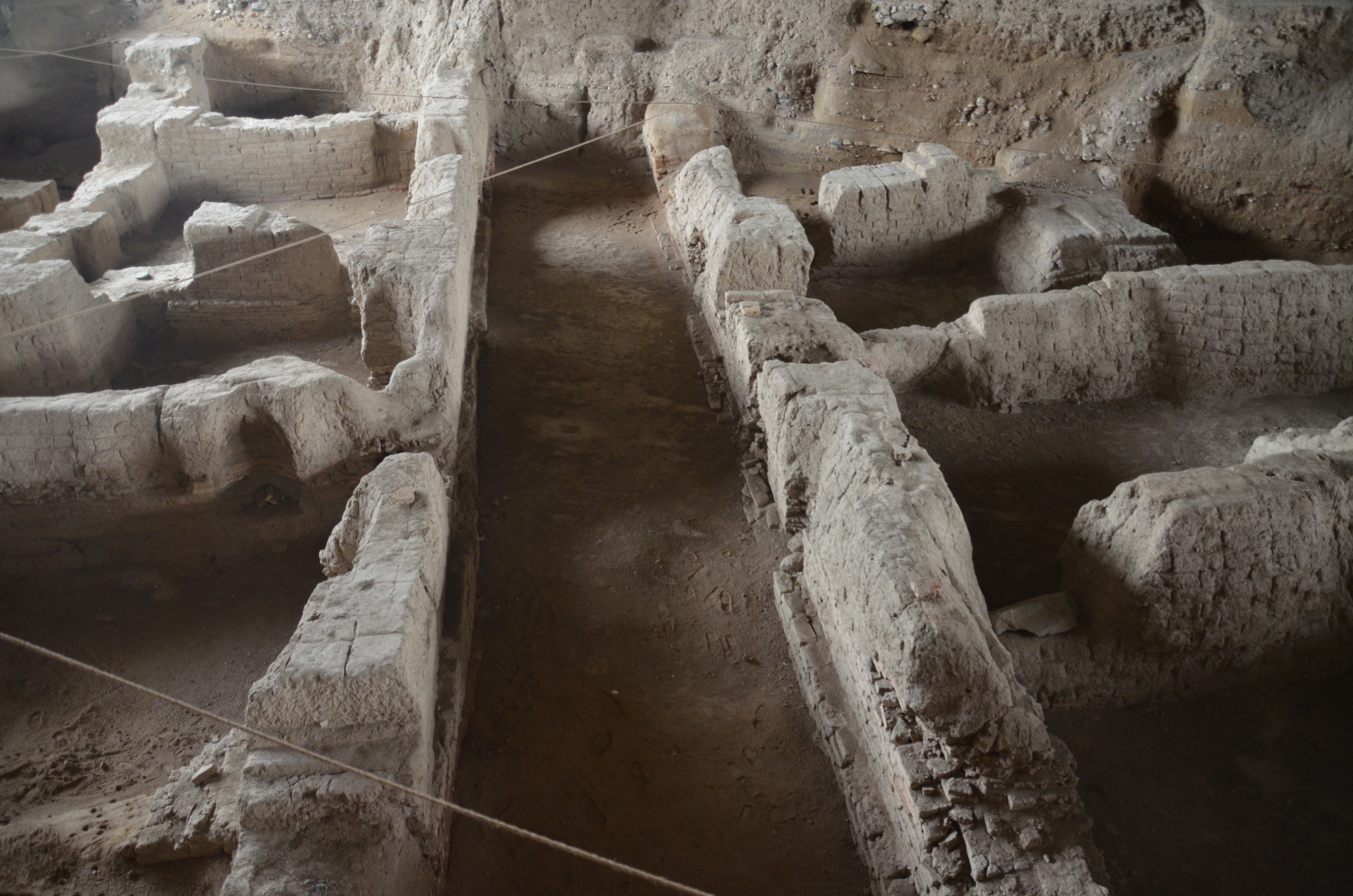
Details of Ecbatana (2)

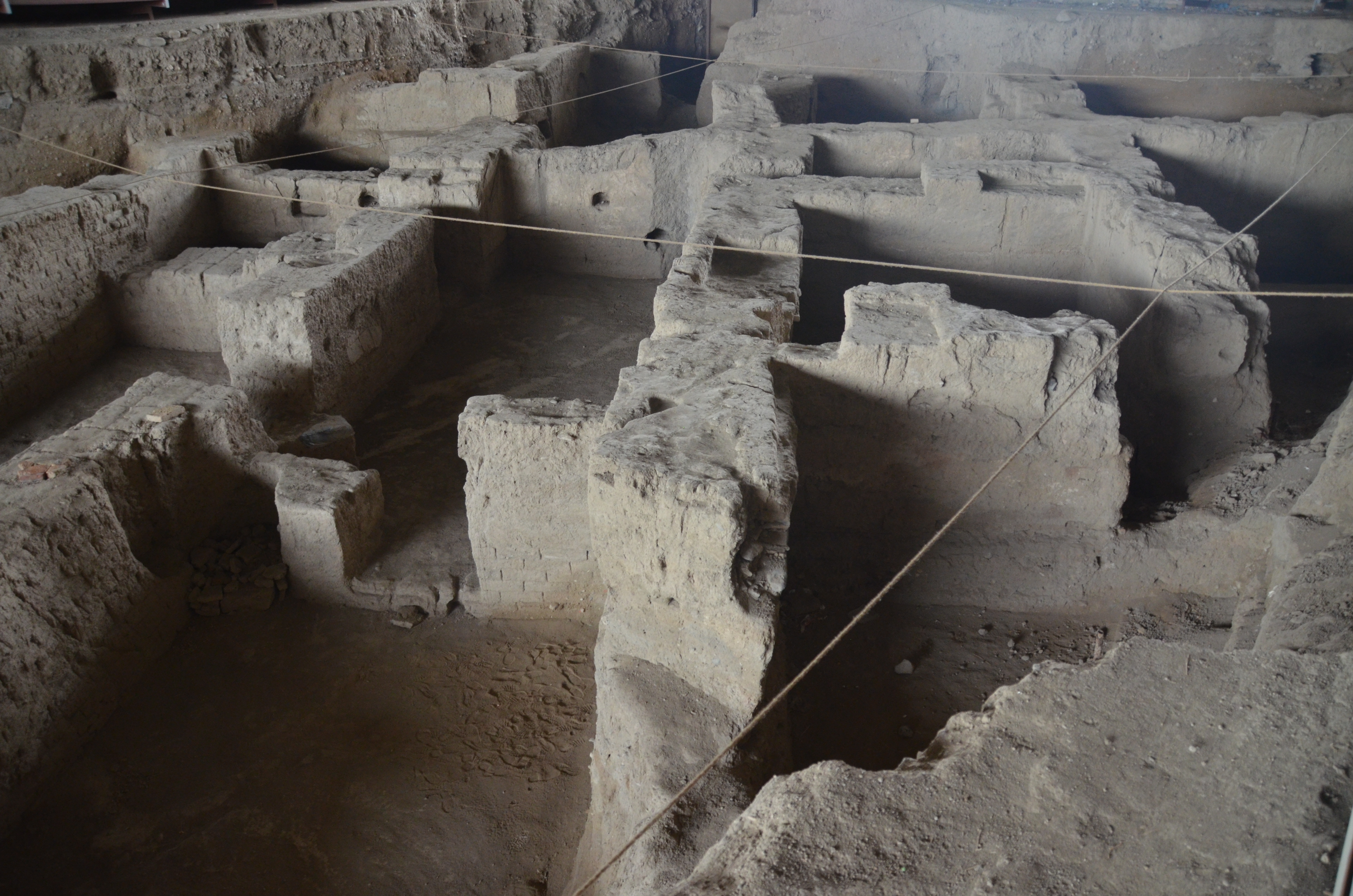
Details of Ecbatana (3)

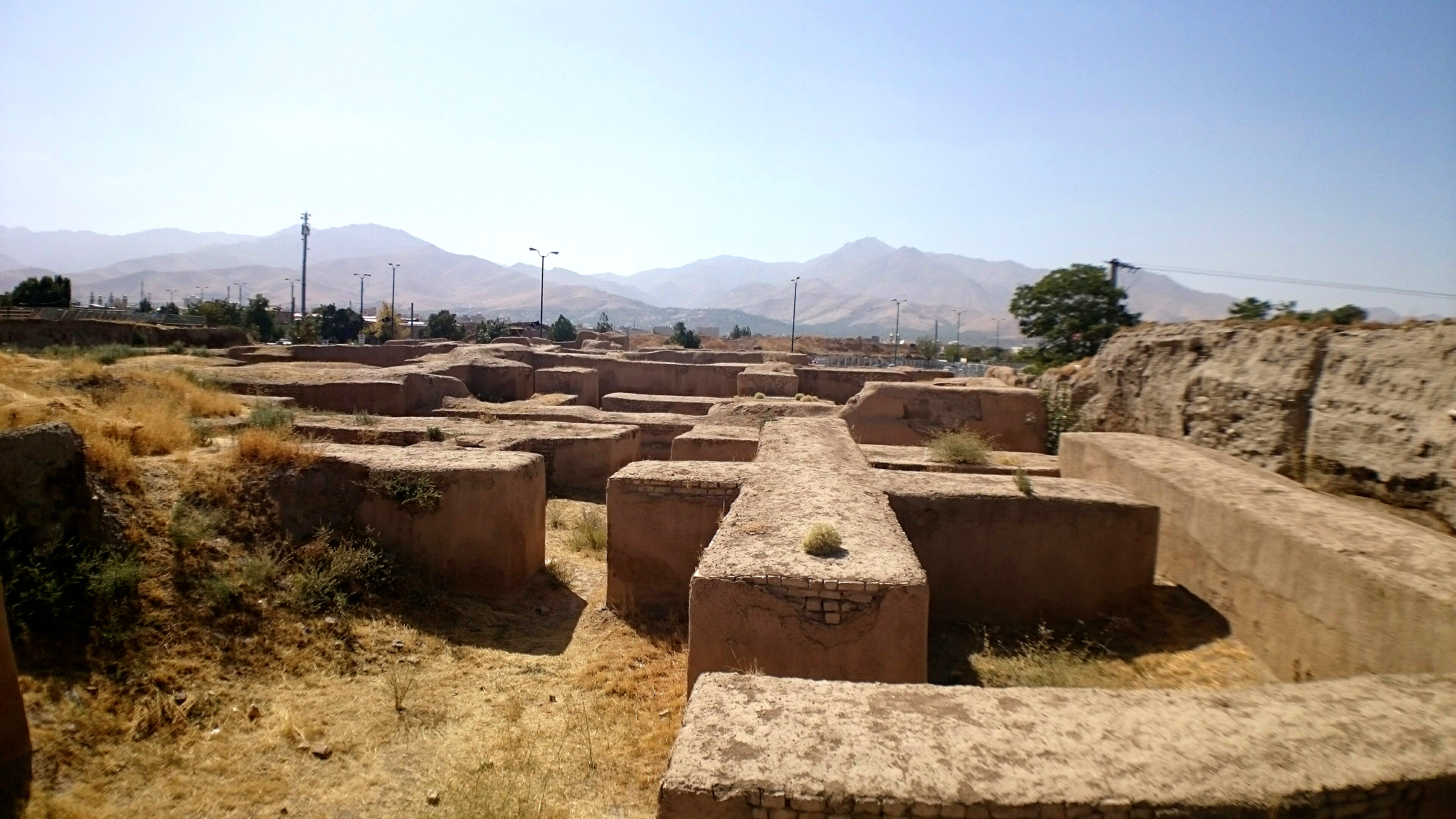
The outer part of Ecbatana (1)

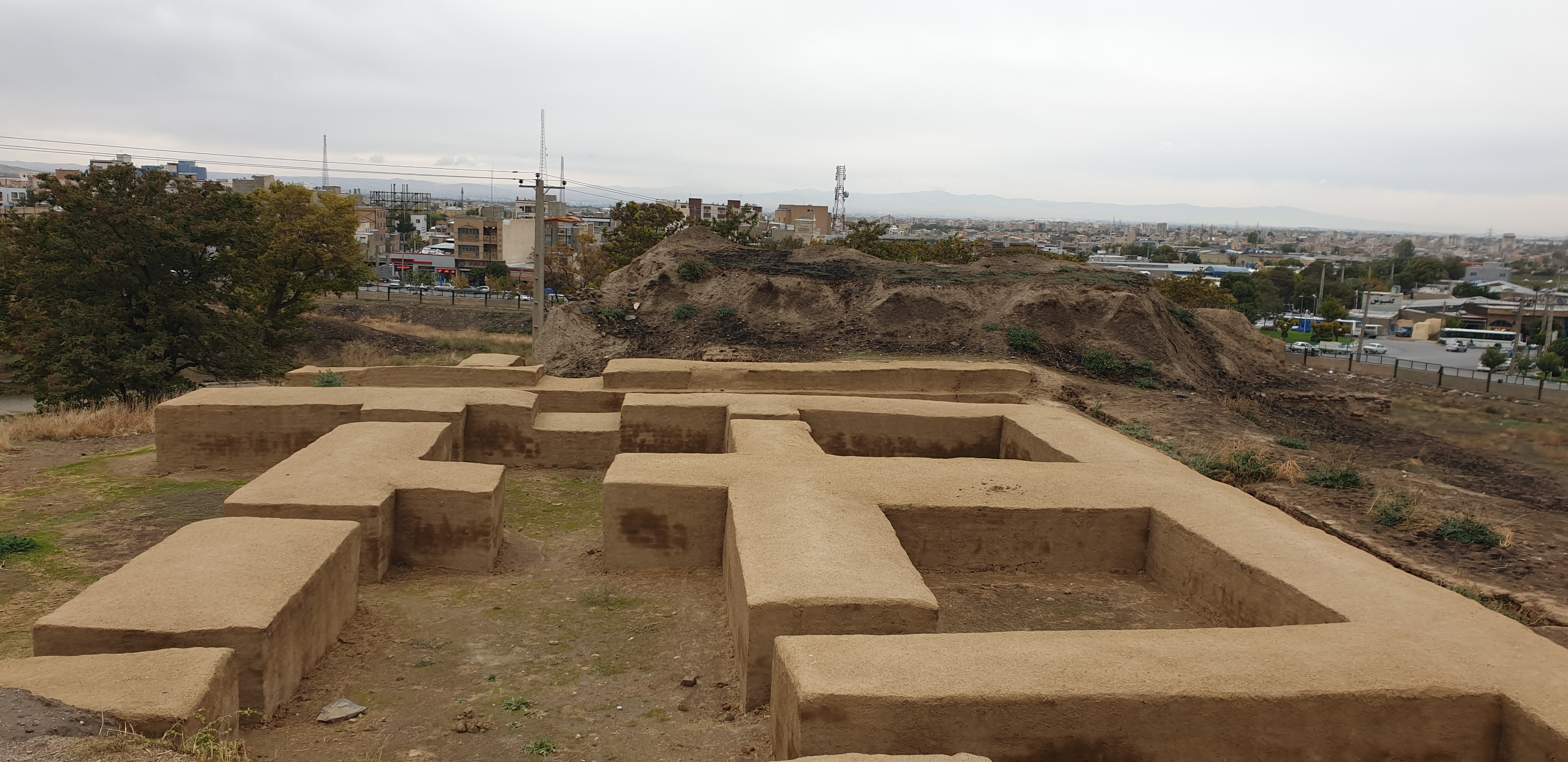
The outer part of Ecbatana (2)

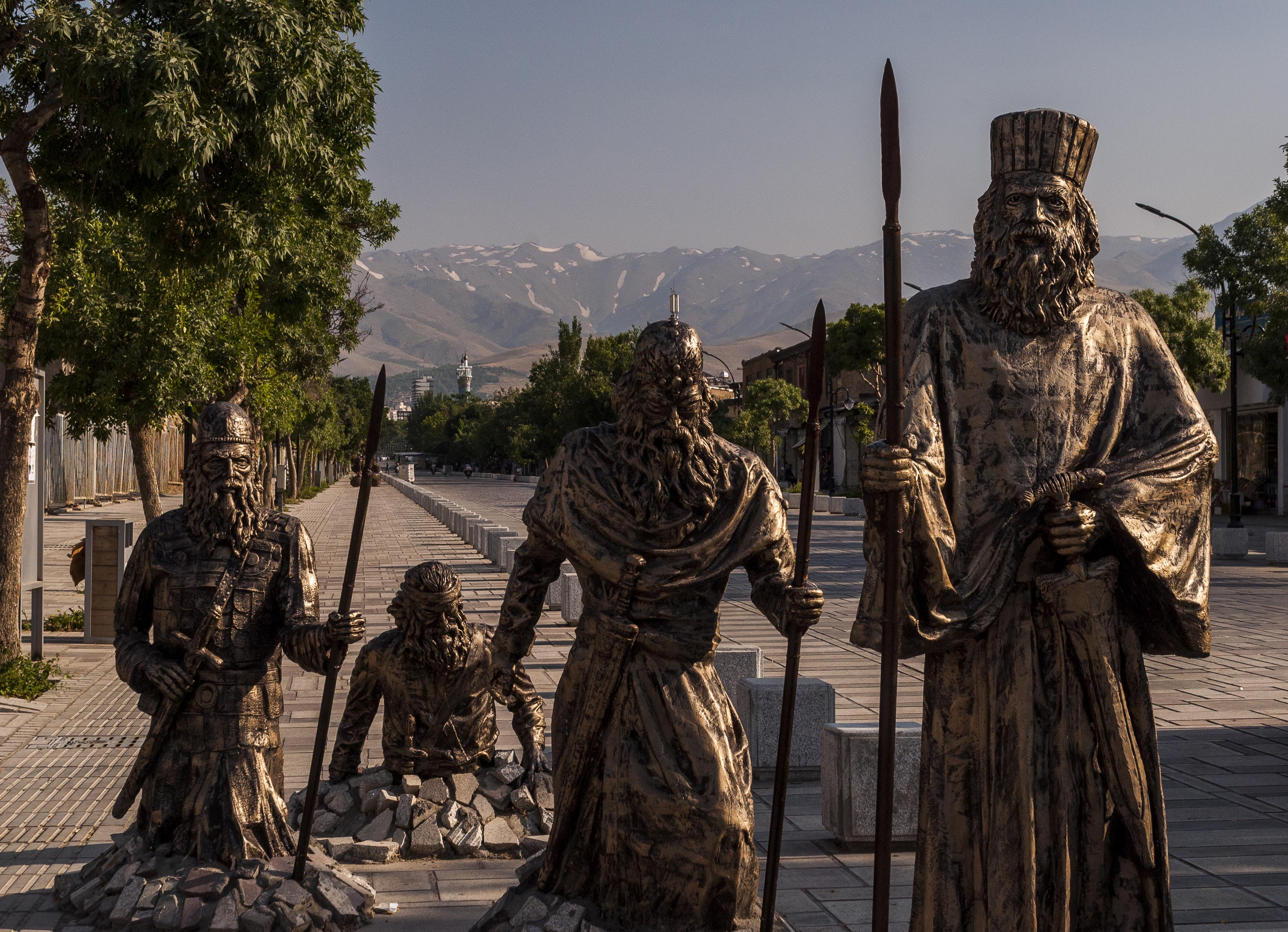
The adjacent street of Ecbatana

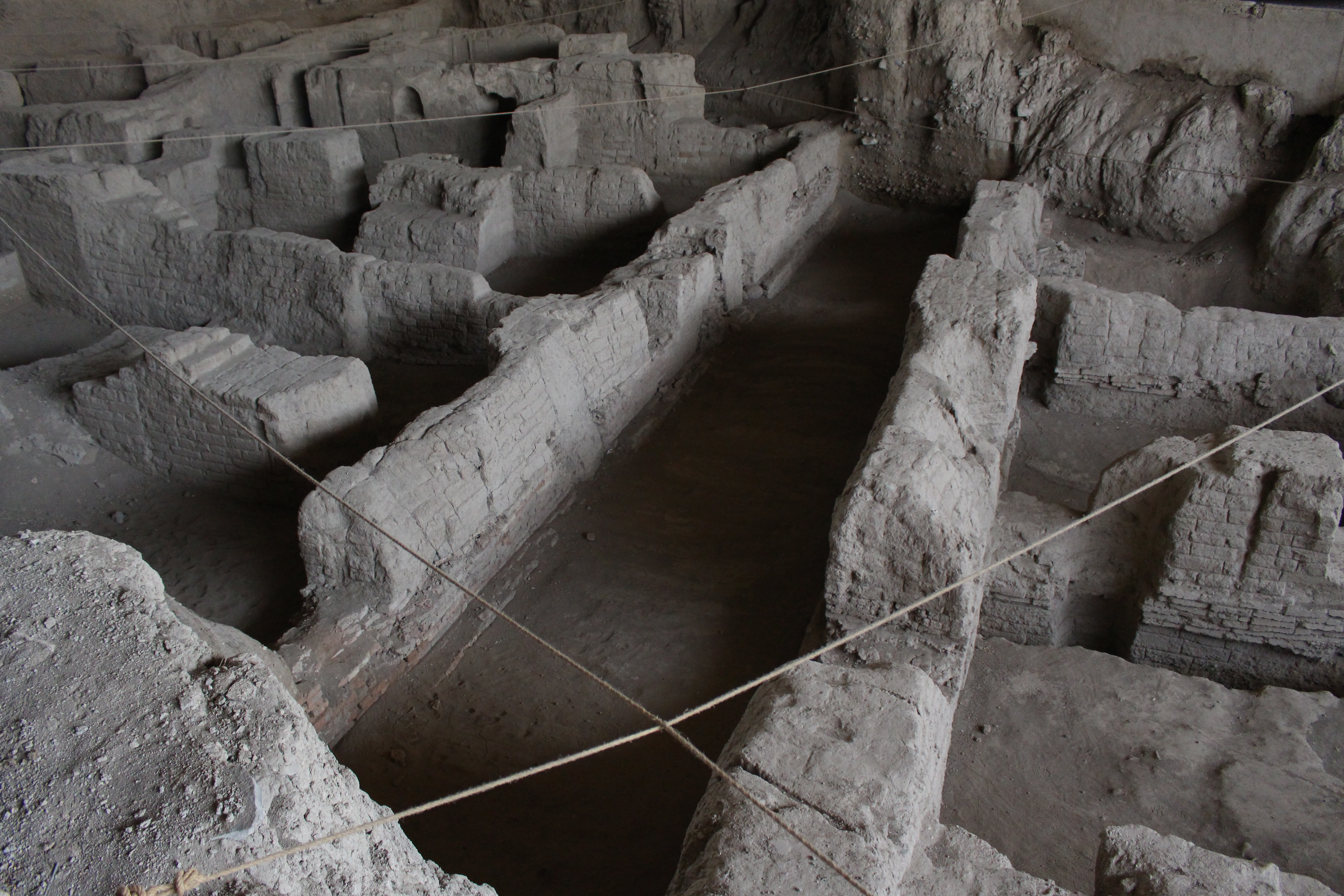
Details of Ecbatana (4)

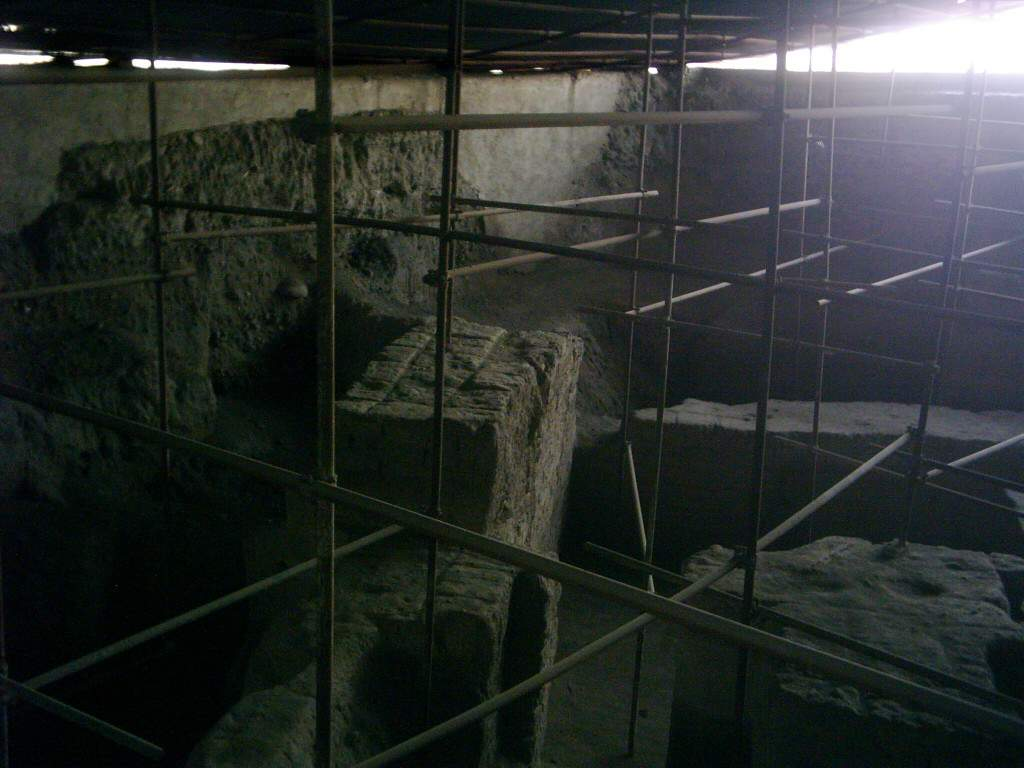
Details of Ecbatana (5)

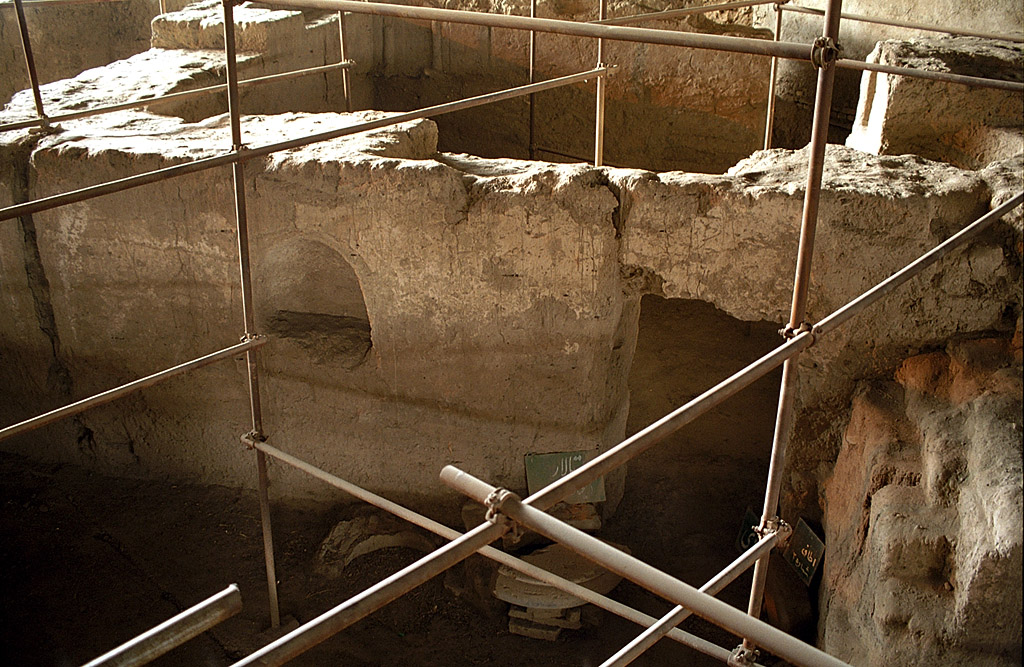
Ecbatana under restoration (1)

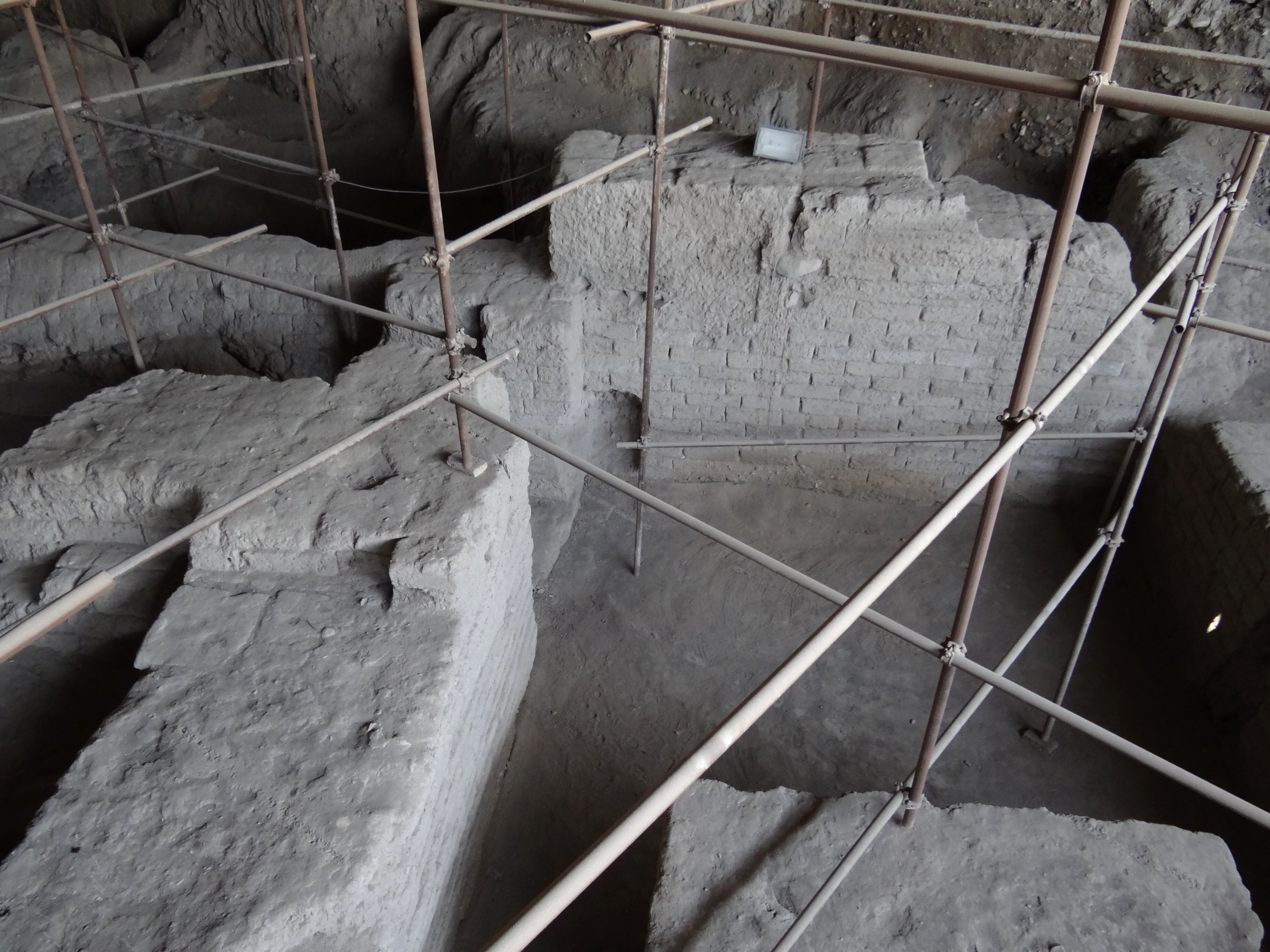
Ecbatana under restoration (2)

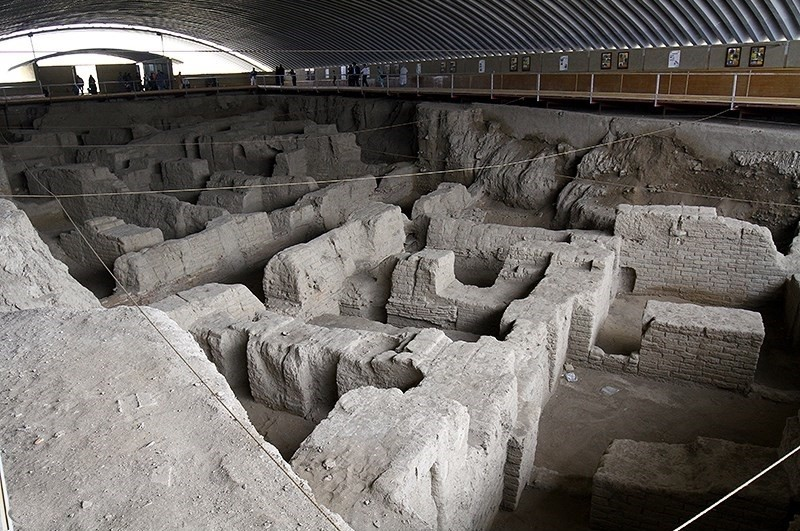
Details of Ecbatana (6)

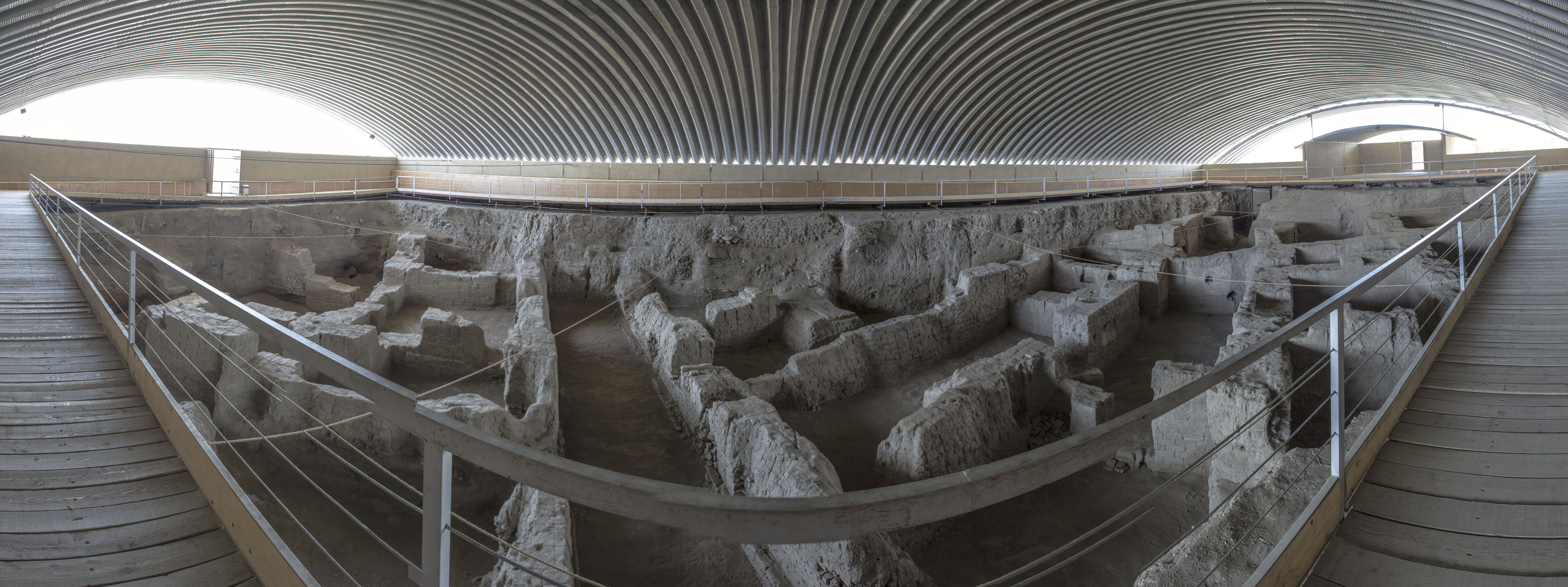
A panoramic view of Ecbatana

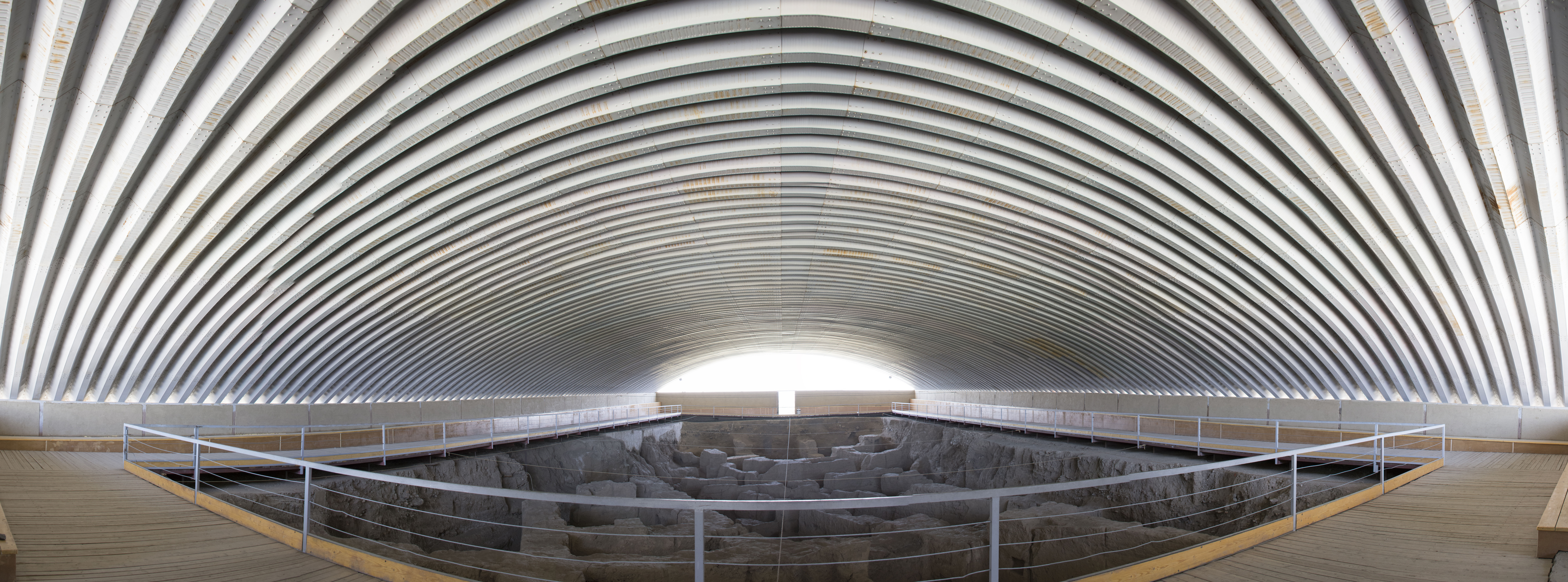
Ecbatana's main site

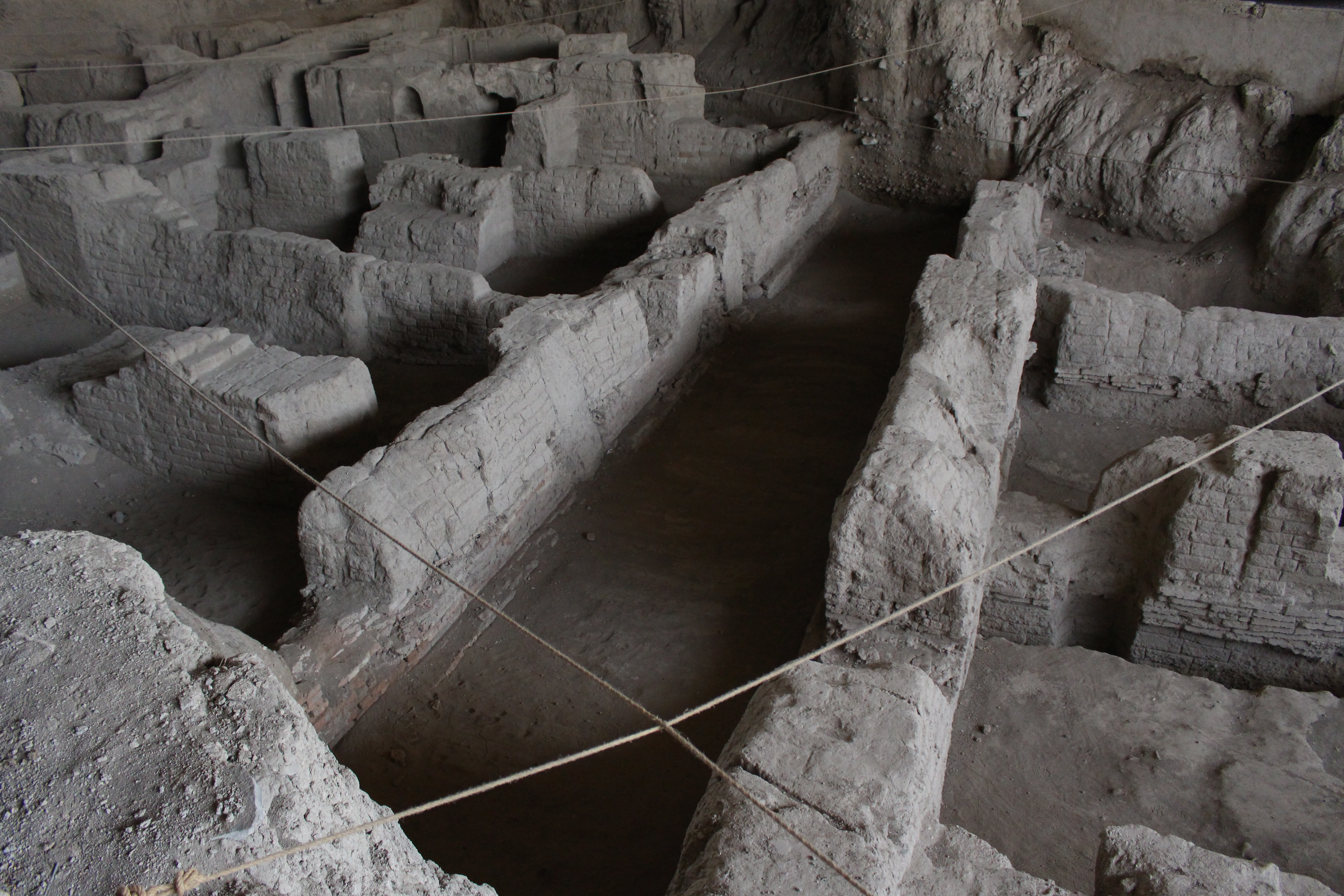
Details of Ecbatana (7)

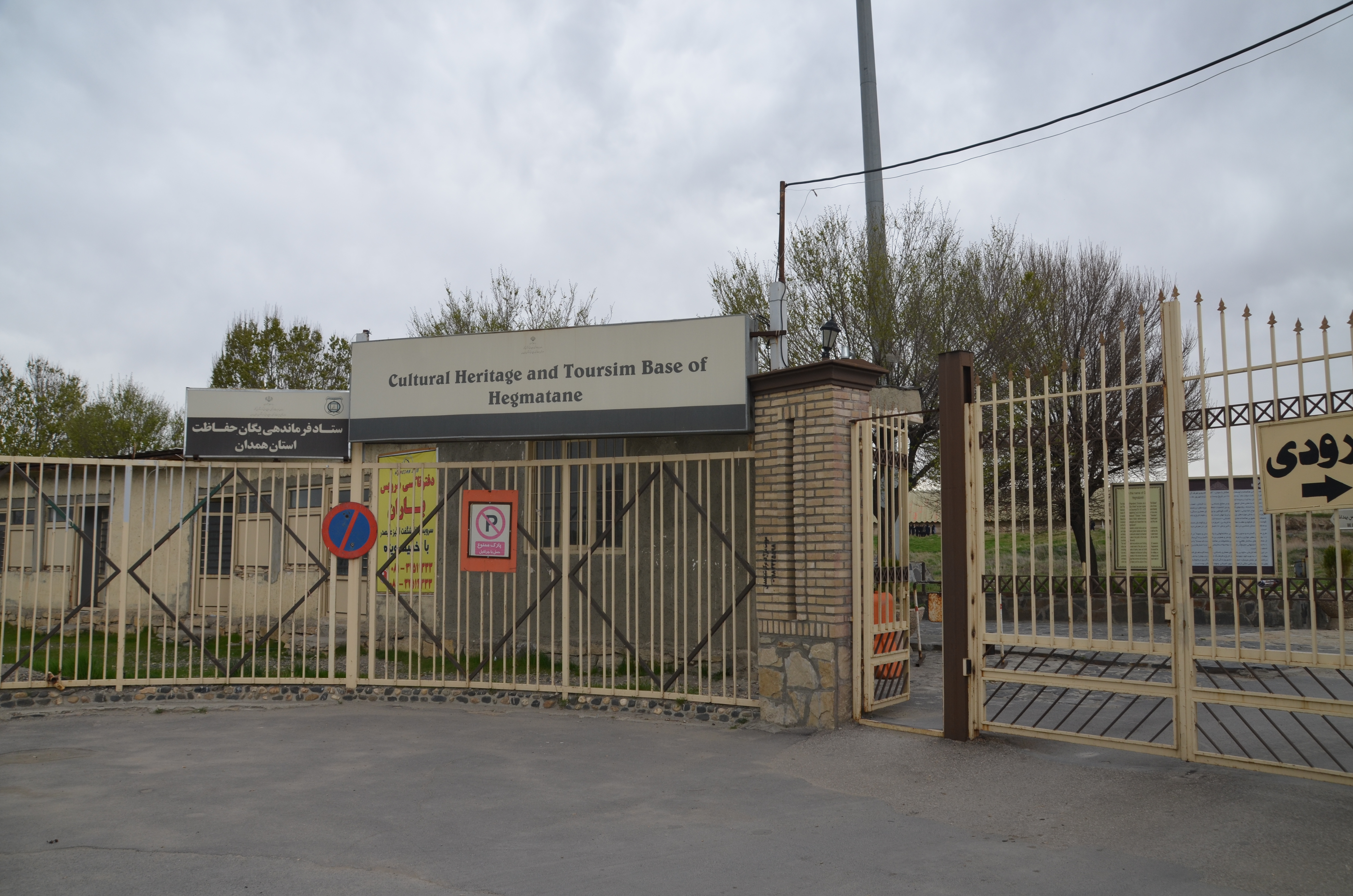
The entrance to Ecbatana

== See also ==
- Cities of the Ancient Near East
- Cartele Abad, village 80 miles to the north
- Kassites
- Helmut W. Diedrichs: A Study at Academia.edu: Ecabtana as home of the wise men The Wise Men from the East and the Star of Bethlehem. -- Fake or fact ? Ecbatana versus Babylon

== Sources ==
- Brown, Stuart C. (1997). "Ecbatana". Encyclopaedia Iranica, Vol. VIII, Fasc. 1. pp. 80–84.
- Sherwin-White, Susan; Kuhrt, Amelie (1993). From Samarkhand to Sardis: A new approach to the Seleucid empire. University of California Press. ISBN 0-520-08183-8.
- Stausberg, Michael; Vevaina, Yuhan Sohrab-Dinshaw; Tessmann, Anna (2015). The Wiley Blackwell Companion to Zoroastrianism. John Wiley & Sons, Ltd.
