= Median kingdom =

Ancient state in West Asia

Median kingdom 𐎶𐎠𐎭 Māda
- c. 678 BCE (Note: The dates that the Greek historian Herodotus attributes to the four Median kings (Deioces, Phraortes, Cyaxares, and Astyages) add up to 150 years, placing the beginning of the Median dynasty in 700 BC. However, Herodotus also states that the Medes ruled Asia for 128 years. Therefore, the start of these 128 years would be in 678 BCE, which, according to the chronology proposed by George Rawlinson, is the year when the reign of Phraortes begins. Phraortes would have overthrown the Assyrian rule in Media and, as Herodotus states, subjugated the Persians and other peoples. As for Deioces, if he existed, he was likely a chief who began consolidating the unity of the Median tribes.)–c. 550 BCE
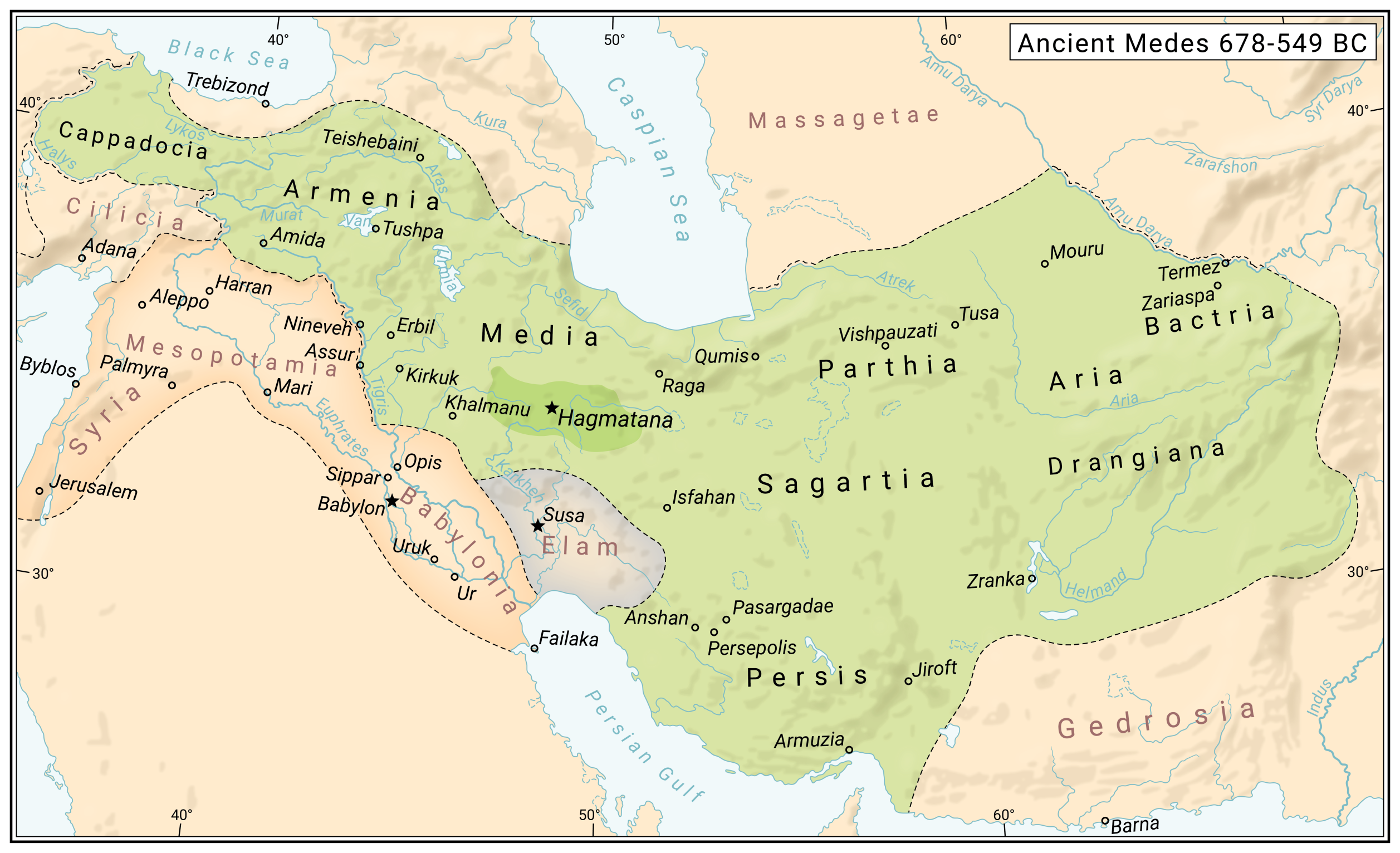
- Hypothetical map of the Median kingdom at its maximum extent
- Capital: Ecbatana
- Common languages: Median
- Religion: Ancient Iranian religion; Mazdaism
- Government: Monarchy
- Kings
  - 700–678 BCE: Deioces
  - 678–625 BCE: Phraortes
  - 625–585 BCE: Cyaxares
  - 585–550 BCE: Astyages
- Historical era: Iron Age
  - Accession of Phraortes: c. 678 BCE (Note: The dates that the Greek historian Herodotus attributes to the four Median kings (Deioces, Phraortes, Cyaxares, and Astyages) add up to 150 years, placing the beginning of the Median dynasty in 700 BC. However, Herodotus also states that the Medes ruled Asia for 128 years. Therefore, the start of these 128 years would be in 678 BCE, which, according to the chronology proposed by George Rawlinson, is the year when the reign of Phraortes begins. Phraortes would have overthrown the Assyrian rule in Media and, as Herodotus states, subjugated the Persians and other peoples. As for Deioces, if he existed, he was likely a chief who began consolidating the unity of the Median tribes.)
  - Median revolt against Assyria: 672 BCE
  - Accession of Cyaxares: 625 BCE
  - Medes and Babylonians conquer Nineveh: 612 BCE
  - Battle of the Eclipse: 585 BCE
  - Conquered by Cyrus the Great: c. 550 BCE

Area
- 585 BCE: 2,800,000 km^{2} (1,100,000 sq mi)
Preceded by	Succeeded by
Neo-Assyrian Empire; Urartu	Achaemenid Empire

Media (Old Persian: 𐎶𐎠𐎭, romanized: Māda; Ancient Greek: Μηδία, romanized: Mēdía; Late Babylonian Akkadian: 𒈠𒁕𒀀𒀀, romanized: Madāya) was a polity centered in Ecbatana that existed from the 7th century BCE until the mid-6th century BCE, and is believed to have dominated a significant portion of the Iranian plateau, preceding the powerful Achaemenid Empire. The frequent interference in the Zagros Mountains by the Neo-Assyrian Empire, located in Upper Mesopotamia, led to the unification of the Median tribes. By 612 BCE, the Medes, in alliance with Babylonia in Lower Mesopotamia, became strong enough to overthrow the declining Neo-Assyrian Empire.

According to classical historiography, Media emerged as one major power of the ancient Near East after the collapse of Assyria. Under Cyaxares (r. 625–585 BCE), the kingdom's borders were expanded to the east and west through the subjugation of neighboring peoples, such as the Persians and Armenians. Media's territorial expansion led to the formation of the first Iranian empire, which at its height would have exercised authority over more than two million square kilometers, stretching from the eastern banks of the Kızılırmak River in Anatolia to Central Asia. In this period, the Median Empire was one of the great powers in the ancient Near East, alongside the Neo-Babylonian Empire, Lydia, and the late period of Egypt. During his reign, Astyages (r. 585–550 BCE) worked to strengthen and centralize the Median state, going against the will of tribal nobility, which may have contributed to the kingdom's downfall. In 550 BCE, the Median capital, Ecbatana, was conquered by the Persian leader Cyrus the Great, marking the beginning of the Achaemenid Empire. However, most historians increasingly view the Median Empire as having been made up by Herodotus and that the Medes were a loose confederacy instead, only uniting under one leader when external powers were attacking Media.

== Historical sources ==
=== Textual sources ===
Not only during the Neo-Assyrian period of the 9th through 7th centuries BCE, but also in the subsequent Neo-Babylonian and early Persian periods, the sources exhibit an external view of the Medes. There is not a single Median source that represents a Median perspective on their own history. The available textual sources on Media primarily consist of contemporary Assyrian and Babylonian texts; the Behistun Inscription in Old Persian; works by later Greek authors such as Herodotus and Ctesias; and some biblical texts. Before the archaeological discoveries of Assyrian and Babylonian ruins and cuneiform archives in the mid-19th century, the history of civilizations in the Near East prior to the Achaemenid Empire relied solely on classical and biblical sources. Information about the Medes, as well as about the Assyrians and Babylonians, was derived from the works of classical authors such as Herodotus and their successors. They gathered information from scholarly circles within the Achaemenid Empire, but it was neither direct nor contemporary, and it was not based on solid archives or historical materials. Although no contemporary textual source has been discovered in Media, the information available in Assyrian and Babylonian sources is quite relevant.

Image of the world according to Herodotus, 5th century BCE

Due to the absence of written records from pre-Achaemenid Media and, until recently, the lack of archaeological evidence, the 'Median logos' of the Greek historian Herodotus (1. 95–106) was for a long time the primary and generally accepted historical account of the ancient Medes. In his account in the first book of his Histories, Herodotus traces the development of a unified Median state or empire with a major capital at Ecbatana and a geographical reach as far west as the Halys River in central Turkey. Although what he describes happened centuries earlier, and he probably relied on unreliable oral accounts, his description can be correlated to some degree with the Assyrian and Babylonian sources. The Greek historian Ctesias worked as a physician in the service of the Achaemenid emperor Artaxerxes II, and wrote about Assyria, Media, and the Achaemenid Empire in his work Persica, consisting of 23 books supposedly based on Persian royal archives. Despite heavily criticizing Herodotus and accusing him of telling many lies, Ctesias follows Herodotus and also reports a long period during which the Medes ruled a vast empire. What has survived from his work is filled with romantic stories, exotic anecdotes, court gossip, and lists of questionable reliability making Ctesias one of the few ancient authors considered not very reliable. However, others have regarded him as an important source.

The Assyrian royal inscriptions, dating from Shalmaneser to Esarhaddon (circa 850-670 BCE), contain the most significant set of historical information about the Medes. The Herodotean account dealing with the period before the Median king Cyaxares has been largely dismissed in favor of contemporary Assyrian records. The Assyrian sources that provide information on the Medes never mention a unified Median state. Instead, these sources indicate a fragmented political landscape comprising small-scale entities headed by various city lords. While scholars have suggested connections between certain individuals in this milieu and the names mentioned in classical sources, all identifications based on name similarity are questionable. The Assyrian sources only offer a clear picture up to c. 650 BCE. For the subsequent period, there is a gap in quantity and quality of Assyrian sources. Historical evidence for a unified Median state comes only very late in the period, when in 615 BCE the Medes reappear in Babylonian sources led by Cyaxares. After this event, the Medes once more receded from history until 550 BCE, when the Persian king Cyrus II defeated the Median king Astyages and became the paramount political figure in Iran. The history of the period c. 650–550 BCE — the apparent zenith of Median power — remains poorly understood. While classical Greek sources claim the existence of a Median Empire during this period, tangible evidence supporting the existence of such an empire has not yet been found, and contemporaneous sources from this period rarely reference the Medes.

=== Archaeological sources ===
The Median period is one of the least understood periods in Iranian archaeology, and the geography of Media remains largely obscure. Any effort to identify distinctive elements of the Median material culture from the Iron Age III (c. 800–550 BCE) in the western region of Iran primarily focuses on sites near the ancient capital of Media, Ecbatana (now Hamadan). Furthermore, the lack of clarity in the archaeological record makes it challenging to determine whether certain archaeological materials should be attributed to the Median or Achaemenid culture. Modern archaeological activity in the central area of ancient Media was especially intense and fruitful in the 1960s and 1970s, with excavations at Godin Tepe, Noushijan, and Bābā Jān Tepe. Additionally, in the adjacent region of the ancient kingdom of Mannaea, excavations at Teppe Hasanlu, and the Ziwiye hoard also yielded productive results. The archaeological activity revealed that, during the 8th and 7th centuries BCE, Median sites experienced significant growth but were depopulated in the first half of the 6th century BCE, a period presumed to be the zenith of development for the supposed Median Empire.

The Nush-i Jan I phase, dated to 750–600 BCE, revealed a sequence of several buildings on the site. The "Central Building" was constructed early in this phase, in the 8th century BCE, while the "Fort" and the "Western Building," the latter featuring a notable columned hall, were added to the site throughout the 7th century BCE. These public buildings were later abandoned, and in the first half of the 6th century BCE, the site was occupied by less institutionalized populations. According to one report, excavators David Stronach and Michael Roaf proposed that the fall of Assyria and the steady decline of Scythian power might have caused the abandonment of fortresses, particularly those near the Median core. In another report, it was suggested that the various buildings were abandoned in different ways during the period when Median power was still on the rise. Godin Tepe's Level II, excavated by T. Cuyler Young and Louis Levine, contains architectural structures similar to those of Nush-i Jan I and presents a similar narrative: the progressive growth of public buildings during Phases 1 to 4, followed by a period of "peaceful abandonment" and "squatter occupation" in Phase 5. Excavations at Baba Jan reveal a comparable sequence, though the excavator adopts a higher chronology: Phase III flourishes in the 9th–8th centuries, with irregular 7th-century occupation, chiefly for historical reasons (alleged Assyrian and Scythian attacks). In any case, the site appears to be completely abandoned in the first half of the 6th century BCE.

The archaeological developments in Mannae appear to have been identical to those in Media: flourishing settlements with public buildings in the second half of the 8th century BCE and throughout the 7th century BCE, followed by a period of irregular occupation in the first half of the 6th century BCE. Such a picture does not align with the reconstruction of a Median Empire based on classical historians. The historian Mario Liverani argues that the archaeological evidence from these Median sites aligns well with the evidence from Mesopotamian sources. Some scholars suggest that the abandonment of Tepe Nush-i Jan and other sites in northwest Iran may be related to the centralization of power in Ecbatana. In this context, Herodotus's observation about Deioces compelling the Median nobles to leave their small cities to live near the capital becomes relevant. One possible scenario suggests that Tepe Nush-i Jan underwent formal closure around 550 BCE, with informal or squatter occupation persisting until approximately 500 BCE. The revised dating implies that Tepe Nush-i Jan and potentially other sites from the Iron III period maintained formal occupation until the onset of the Achaemenid period. If this is the case, there would be no interruption in the occupation of Median sites between 600 and 550 BCE, as some scholars suggest, which would imply a breakdown of central authority in this period. According to Stuart Brown, the rise of Persian dominance may have been a contributing factor to the abandonment of various Median sites, including Godin Tepe.

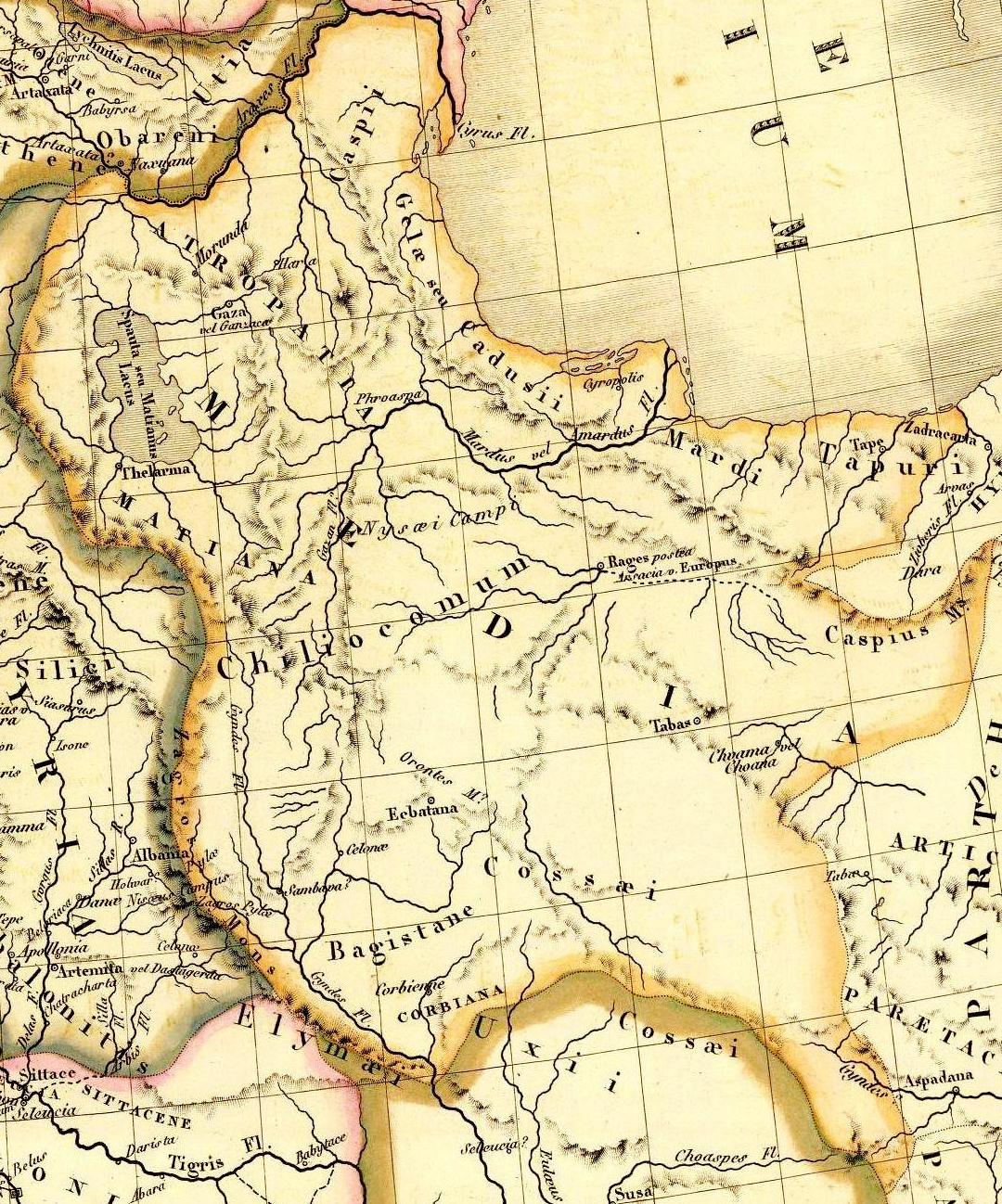
Map of Media, from 1839

Several excavated sites such as Godin Tepe, Tepe Nush-i Jan, Moush Tepe, Gunespan, Baba Jan and Tepe Ozbaki, show significant commonalities in architecture, ceramics, and small finds to be considered as arguably Median. Median settlement can be summarized as dispersed with fortified nodes controlling major plains, valley and passes. The largest sites identified in Media measure only 3-4 hectares, the size of small villages. Notably, monumental architecture found many Median sites does not appear to be integrated into larger settlements. It is difficult to reconcile this archaeological picture with the system of “city leaders” mentioned in the Assyrian sources. The capital of Media, Ecbatana, is a site of great interest for archaeological study, but excavations so far have revealed remains belonging to the Sasanian Empire. The early capital city at Ecbatana is simply buried or destroyed by the substantial subsequent occupation of the site. Identification of Median sites beyond Iran is challenging, but certain ceramic and architectural features may indicate dispersed Median presence or at least some influence at sites such as Nor Armavir and Arinberd in Armenia, Altıntepe, Van and Tille Höyük in Turkey, Qyzqapan and Tell Gubba in Iraq, and Ulug Depe in Turkmenistan. The archaeological findings at the Urartian site of Erebuni, in Armenia, has shown that a columned hall initially dated to the Achaemenid period is now likely to have been constructed in the late 7th century. This is the period following the fall of Assyria, when the Medes would have begun their expansion northward, according to Herodotus. A similar columned hall at Altıntepe in eastern Turkey may also be dated to this period. The spread of the columned hall form before the ascension of the Achaemenid Empire suggests some form of Median presence or influence in adjacent regions during the late 7th and early 6th centuries BCE. Evidence from recent excavations and surveys suggests that permanent settlement in Media persisted beyond the late 7th century BCE. Monumental construction appears to have continued at various sites, and an early form of money was apparently in use in the heart of Media around 600 BCE. However, the Median Empire is still not a concrete archaeological fact, and its history is largely based on information provided by Herodotus and other texts directly or indirectly influenced by him.

== History ==
=== Assyrian campaigns in Media ===
Map of the Neo-Assyrian Empire

At the end of the 2nd millennium BCE, Median tribes began settling in the territory of future Media in western Iran. From the 9th century BCE, the Assyrians regularly invaded and plundered regions in northwest Iran, where numerous small principalities existed at that time. The first mention of the Medes in Assyrian texts dates back to 834 BCE when the Assyrian king Shalmaneser III (r. 858–824 BCE) returned from a military campaign, passing through the Median territory in the Hamadan plain. The Medes formed numerous small entities under tribal chiefs, and despite subduing several Median chiefs, Assyrian kings never conquered all of Media. In 815 BCE, Shamshi-Adad V (r. 823–811 BCE) marched against Sagbita, the "royal city" of Median chief Hanaşiruka, and conquered it. According to the Assyrian inscription, 2,300 Medes were killed, and Sagbita, along with 1,200 settlements nearby, was destroyed. This campaign was significant as Assyria henceforth imposed regular tribute on the Median tribes in horses, cattle, and handicraft products. The Assyrians now shifted the main direction of their attacks to Media, partly influenced by events around Lake Urmia, where, by the late 9th century BCE, the Urartians had conquered the west and south shores of Lake Urmia and began advancing towards Mannea. Assyria failed to halt the Urartian advance and gradually became an ally of Mannea in its struggle against Urartu. The Assyrians could not secure victories in the six campaigns (in 809, 800, 799, 793, 792, and 788 BCE) waged against the Medes by Adad-nirari III (r. 810–781 BCE), and subsequently a long political crisis began to develop in Assyria. Later, during the reign of Tiglath-Pileser III (r. 745–728 BCE), Assyria began organizing provinces in conquered lands, ensuring a regular source of income and providing a base for further territorial conquests. The Assyrian borders approached Media proper when in 744 BCE, the Assyrians created, in addition to the already established province of Zamua, two more provinces called Bit Ḫamban and Parsua, where they installed governors and garrisons. In the same year, the Assyrians received tribute from the Medes and Manneans, and in 737 BCE, Tiglath-Pileser invaded Media, reaching its remote parts and demanding tribute from the "city lords" of the Medes up to the Salt Desert and Mount Bikni. In an account of this campaign, Tiglath-Pileser mentions "the provinces of the mighty Medes" and claims to have deported 6,500 people from northwest Iran to Syria and Phoenicia.

Under Sargon II (r. 722–705 BCE), Assyrian presence in Media reached its zenith. Sargon aimed to establish direct administrative control over these distant regions, following the provincial system already implemented in more accessible and nearby areas. Assyrian governors coexisted with local city lords: the former likely responsible for overseeing long-distance trade and tax collection, while the latter retained power for handling local affairs. In 716 BCE, Sargon made Harhar and Kišesim centers of new Assyrian provinces, adding to them some other territories of west Media, including Sagbita, and renamed these provinces Kar-Sarrukin and Kar-Nergal, respectively. Despite being active in the Zagros region, Sennacherib (r. 704-681 BCE) operated only on a very low-key level compared to his predecessors Tiglath-Pileser III and Sargon II. This may suggest that after the initial problems to control the new provinces Kar-Sarrukin and Kar-Nergal things proceeded smoothly in the eastern Assyrian territories after 713 BCE. The established dual system, involving the Assyrian provincial administration and local city lords, seems to have found an equilibrium that was mutually beneficial. The extant sources available shows the continued Assyrian control over the provinces founded by Tiglath-Pileser and Sargon, at least until the reign of Esarhaddon. In 702 BCE, Sennacherib engaged with the Medes during a campaign against the Zagros kingdom of Ellipi. This marked his only recorded direct contact with the Medes in their own territory, receiving tribute from the Medes residing outside regions controlled by the Assyrians.

The Assyrians consistently referred to the Medes as living in settlements ruled by bēl ālāni (“city lords”). The coalescence of broader authoritative power presumably had its origins in the interpersonal relationships among these Median bēl ālāni. The application of a model of secondary state formation to the case of Media proposes that, stimulated by decades of aggressive Assyrian intrusion, Median bēl ālāni learned by example how to organize and administer themselves politically and economically so as to achieve state-like status. Frequent Assyrian attacks compelled various inhabitants of Media to cooperate and develop more effective leadership. The Assyrians valued goods from the east, such as Bactrian lapis lazuli, and the east-west trade route through Media became increasingly crucial. Trade might explain Ecbatana's rise as the central city of Media and could have triggered the unification process.

=== Unification ===
According to Herodotus, Deioces strategically plotted to establish autocratic rule over the Medes. In a time of widespread lawlessness in Media, Deioces diligently worked to establish justice, earning a reputation as an impartial and fair judge. Eventually, he ceased administering justice, leading to chaos in Media. This prompted the Medes to assemble and decide to elect a king, ultimately resulting in Deioces becoming their ruler. Then, a fortress city named Ecbatana was constructed where all governing authority was centralized. However, this is not indicated in contemporary textual sources or archaeological findings. Judging by Assyrian sources, no unified Median state, as described by Herodotus for the reign of Deioces, existed in the early 7th century BCE. His account is at best a Median legend about the foundation of their kingdom. In contrast, Ctesias presents a different narrative centered around a Mede named Arbaces. Arbaces served as a general in the Assyrian army and as the governor of the Medes on behalf of the Assyrian king. He met his later ally, the Babylonian Belesys, at Nineveh, where both commanded Assyria's Median and Babylonian auxiliary troops during a year of military service. Encouraged by the weakness of the Assyrian king Sardanapalus, Arbaces and Belesys rebelled against Assyria, and Arbaces emerged as the first king of Media. While names similar or identical to Deioces and Arbaces do appear in Assyrian sources, these names seem to have been common among the people on the Iranian Plateau during the Assyrian period. Thus, none of the individuals with these names can be conclusively identified as the protagonists described by the Greek historians. Although some characters in Herodotus and Ctesias can be identified with figures known in Assyrian and Babylonian sources, the narratives presented by these Greek historians deviate from the course of events found in Near Eastern sources. Consequently, it remains unknown to what extent many details in their stories reflect historical reality.

The Assyrian king Esarhaddon (r. 680–669 BCE) conducted several expeditions into Iranian territory. Compared to Sargon's conquests, Esarhaddon's campaign results were rather insignificant. Most likely in 676 BCE, and certainly before 672 BCE, city lords Uppis of Partakka, Zanasana of Partukka, and Ramateia of Urakazabarna brought horses and lapis lazuli as tribute to Nineveh. These rulers who hailed from regions beyond the Assyrian Zagros provinces submitted to Esarhaddon and sought his assistance against rival city lords. This episode is followed by the deportation of two city lords from the country of Patušarri to Assyria, here Esarhaddon's activities against the "distant" Medes reached to the Caspian Sea and the Salt Desert near Mount Bikni. However, unlike his predecessors, Esarhaddon does not seem to have expanded Assyrian territory in Iran. Ramateia is also mentioned in the so-called "oaths of loyalty" concluded on the occasion of the appointment of the Assyrian throne successor in 672 BCE. In that year, agreements were made between Esarhaddon and chiefs from various western regions of Media, ensuring their loyalty to the Assyrian king and the security of their possessions. Scholars generally view this agreement as a "vassal treaty" imposed by the Assyrian administration on recently subdued vassals. However, Mario Liverani argued that this agreement resulted from internal struggles among various Median groups and the presence of armed Median warriors in the Assyrian palace serving as bodyguards to the crown prince. The Median chiefs had to swear that their men in the Assyrian court would be loyal to Esarhaddon and his son, Ashurbanipal.

Judging by Assyrian texts from the time of Esarhaddon, the situation on the Assyrian eastern borders was extremely tense. While going into the Assyrian provinces in the Zagros in order to collect tribute is routine of the various governors after 713 BCE, such missions were fraught with danger in the time of Esarhaddon. This increased risk stemmed not only from traditional adversaries like the Medes and Manneans but also from the Cimmerians and Scythians active in Iran. The primary threat in the east emanated from the actions of Kaštaritu, the city lord of Kār-Kaššî, who is prominently mentioned in oracle queries concerning Median affairs. The Assyrians perceived Kaštaritu as a political leader of substantial influence and a force to be reckoned with; Esarhaddon worried about Kaštaritu plotting with other Median city lords, mobilizing against Assyria and attacking the Assyrian strongholds and cities. The available sources don't reveal whether a peaceful or military resolution for the trouble with Kaštaritu was achieved, this silence may suggest a negative outcome. Attacks on Assyrian strongholds show that Assyria started to lose control of territory in the east under Esarhaddon's reign. Saparda, which was made part of the province of Harhar in 716 BCE, was not under Assyrian control anymore and its city lord Dusanni is mentioned, alongside Kaštaritu, as an enemy of Assyria in several oracle queries. In Ashurbanipal’s reign (r. 668–630 BCE), references to the Medes become very sparse. Ashurbanipal reports that three Median city lords had rebelled against Assyrian rule were defeated and brought to Nineveh during his fifth campaign in 656 BCE. This is the last mention of Medes in the Assyrian sources. The fact that the three Median rulers are described as city lords may indicate that the powers structure among the Medes at this time was the same as in the 8th century. It is unknown whether the Assyrian provinces in the Zagros, Parsua, Bīt-Hamban, Kišesim (Kār-Nergal) and Harhar (Kar-Sarrukin), were still part of the empire during Ashurbanipal's reign. Although the Assyrian sources maintain silence about the Iranians during this period, suggesting that Assyria was less concerned with them than during the reign of Esarhaddon, everything seems to indicate that the Assyrians were losing control over the provinces established in the Zagros. This could have created room for the development of a unified Median state and although Assyrian sources make no reference to a united Median territorial state that would be comparable to Assyria itself or other contemporary principalities such as Elam, Mannea or Urartu, many scholars remain reluctant to assign no historical relevance whatsoever to Herodotus' account.

The Medes reappear in contemporary sources about forty years later in 615 BCE, under the leadership of Cyaxares, launching an attack on the Assyrian heartland and allying with the Babylonians. Nothing in the existing Assyrian sources provide insights into how Cyaxares assumed leadership of a unified Median force since the preceding decades is marked by a scarcity of sources concerning Assyria's internal and foreign policies, creating a fragmented understanding of the second half of the 7th century BCE. Current reasoning suggests that the transition toward a unified state may have occurred in the period from 670 to 615 BCE, during the reign of Ashurbanipal or his successors. The lack of Assyrian records or other contemporary sources for this period left room for the acceptance of Herodotus's account. While the Greek historian's information about earlier periods lacks reliability, in the case of Cyaxares, his existence and role in the fall of Nineveh are corroborated by the Babylonian Chronicle. Thus, other details regarding the chronology of his reign and his status as the king of a unified state have more credibility. According to Herodotus, Deioces was succeeded by his son Phraortes. Herodotus may have advanced the events linked with the Median kings by one reign. Thus, the founder of the Median Kingdom, who united all Median tribes and build the new capital of Media, could have been Deioces' successor. Phraortes is commonly identified with Kaštaritu, who led the Median revolt against the Assyrians in 672 BCE, although some scholars tend to reject or consider this identification doubtful. Other scholars believe that the Medes were only unified under Cyaxares, who, according to Herodotus, was the son of Phraortes and began his reign around 625 BCE. From 627 BCE onward the Assyrians were definitely in serious trouble both at home and in Babylonia and, therefore, the Median kingdom most likely emerged after 627, or possibly already after 631 BCE.

=== Scythian interregnum ===
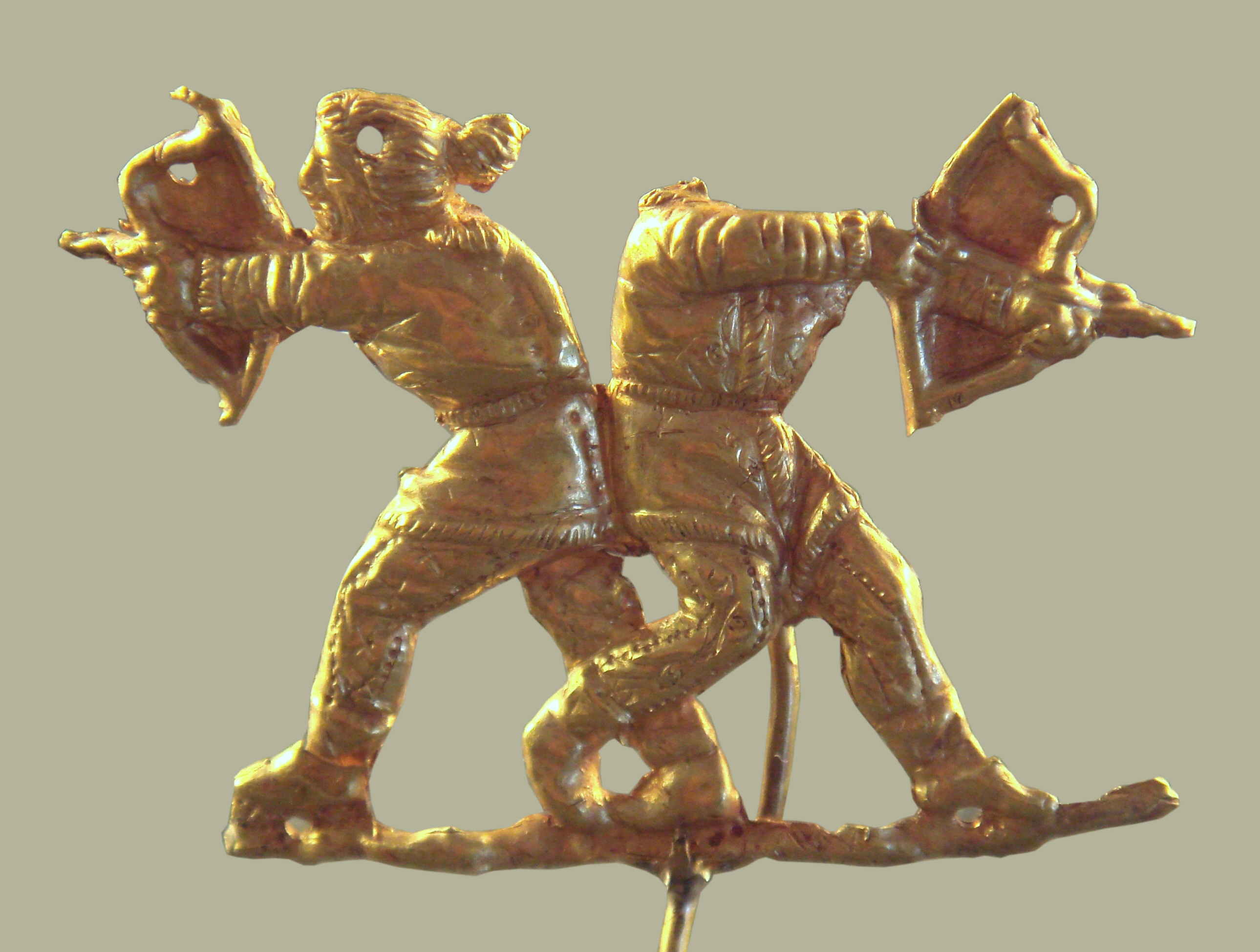
Scythian archers shooting with a composite bow, Kerch, Ukraine, 4th century BCE

In ancient times, the vast areas north of the Black and Caspian Seas were inhabited by the Scythians. In the late 8th and early 7th centuries BCE, groups of nomadic warriors entered western Iran. Among the dominant groups were the Scythians, and their involvement in the affairs of the western plateau during the 7th century BCE may mark one of the most significant turning points in Iron Age history. Herodotus provides some details about a Scythian dominance period, the so-called Scythian interregnum in the Median dynasty. The dating of this event remains uncertain but is traditionally seen as occurring between the reigns of Phraortes and Cyaxares. Russian Iranologist Edvin Grantovsky dates this event between 635 and 615 BCE, while historian George Cameron dates it between 653 and 625 BCE.

According to Herodotus, king Phraortes led an attack against Assyria, but the Assyrian king managed to repel the invasion, and Phraortes, along with much of his army, died in the battle. Herodotus reports that Cyaxares, wanting to avenge his father's death, marched with the army toward the Assyrian capital, Nineveh, with the aim of destroying the city. While besieging Nineveh, the Medes were attacked by a large Scythian army under the command of Madyes, son of Bartatua. A battle ensued, in which the Medes were defeated, losing their power in Asia, which was entirely taken over by the Scythians. The Scythian yoke was said to be unbearable, characterized by brutality, injustice, and high taxes. According to Herodotus, Cyaxares invited the Scythian leaders to a feast, induced them to drink until they were thoroughly intoxicated, attacked and easily killed them. Subsequently, a war ensued resulting in the defeat of the Scythians. However, it is more likely that, during this time, the Scythians voluntarily withdrew from western Iran to raid elsewhere or were simply absorbed by a rapidly developing confederation under Median hegemony.

Herodotus believed that the period from the Scythian victory over the Medes to the assassination of the Scythian leaders was exactly 28 years, but this chronology is problematic. It is highly unlikely that the Scythians could have dominated the Medes for nearly three decades. The Scythians, being nomads, were fierce warriors but incapable of ruling large territories for an extended period. This and other reasons lead to the conclusion that the Scythian domination was much shorter. It couldn't have been long after the Scythian attack for the Medes to begin recovering and clearing their territories of the Scythians. If the invasion occurred during the reign of Cyaxares, and not Phraortes, it is likely that less than a decade after its occurrence, the Medes were strong enough to resume their old plans and, for the second time, lead an army into Assyria. Although Herodotus's account of the Scythian interregnum is not implausible except for the duration of Scythian domination, his narrative has a legendary character and is not reliable. Despite the doubtful historicity of the Scythian interregnum, the Scythians are mentioned in Assyrian sources during the same period of the supposed interregnum.

=== Fall of the Assyrian Empire ===
Map of the Neo-Assyrian Empire

After the death of Ashurbanipal in 631 BCE, the Assyrian Empire entered a period of political instability. In 626 BCE, the Babylonians rebelled against Assyrian domination. Nabopolassar, governor of southern regions and leader of the revolt, was soon recognized as king of Babylon. Nabopolassar gained control of Babylon but not all of Babylonia from the Assyrians and was engaged in serious fighting, he must have been looking for any possible allies. Interestingly, Herodotus mentions that the Median king Phraortes was killed around 625 BCE during an unsuccessful invasion of Assyria. There is no evidence regarding the relations between the Medes and Assyrians from 624 to 617 BCE. It is unknown whether the Medes were still geographically separated from the Assyrian heartland by the Zagros Mountains and surrounding peoples, or if they were already asserting themselves in the mountainous Assyrian provinces, particularly in Mazamua (modern Suleimaniya). However, for the subsequent years from 616 to 595, much of the Babylonian Chronicle is preserved and provides reasonably reliable account of events. The source is not a complete record of the history of the period, and is focused exclusively on events in Mesopotamia. After securing full control of Babylonian territory, Nabopolassar (r. 626–605 BCE) marched against Assyria.

In 616 BCE, the Babylonians defeated an Assyrian army on the middle Euphrates and captured Mannean forces who were helping the Assyrians. Whether the Kingdom of Mannea still existed by this time remains uncertain. In the same year, the Babylonians defeated the Assyrians near Arrapḫa (modern Kirkuk). In the third month of 615 BCE, the Babylonians marched directly up the Tigris and attacked Assur but were driven back. In the eighth month, the Medes were active near Arrapḫa, which suggests a mutual arrangement between Medes and Babylonians. Since Arrapḫa was very close to the principal centers of the Assyrian heartland (Assur, Nineveh, and Arbela), all of the empire's positions in western Iran had likely already been lost. The Medes reached Nineveh by the fifth month of 614 BCE, ravaging the territory between Arrapḫa and Nineveh. In mid-614 BCE, the Medes captured Tarbiṣu, a city little to the north of the Assyrian capital Nineveh, and then moved down the Tigris to attack Assur, which they captured before the arrival of the Babylonian army that was coming to their assistance. This collaborative effort indicates a pre-existing alliance between Nabopolassar and the Median king Cyaxares (r. 625–585 a.C.), they then met personally and formalized their relationship. The Babylonian historian Berossus mentions that this alliance between Babylon and Media was sealed with the marriage of Amytis, probably the daughter of Cyaxares, with the son of Nabopolassar, Nebuchadnezzar II. Afterwards Cyaxares and his army went home. In 613 BCE, the Medes are not mentioned in the chronicle. However, in 612 BCE, a king of the ummān-manda appears on the scene; he is surely identical with the king of the Medes, although it is strange that a single cuneiform tablet should describe one people by two different terms. The combined military forces of Cyaxares and Nabopolassar laid siege to Nineveh, resulting in its fall after three months. After the sack of the Assyrian capital, only the Babylonians seem to have continued the campaign and a part of the Babylonian army marched on Nasibina and Rasappa, while Cyaxares and his army returned to Media. Meanwhile the Assyrians were regrouping under a new king further west at Harran. The Medes appear to be absent from the account of 611 BCE, while the Babylonians are militarily active advancing towards Syria and the upper Euphrates. The Egyptian pharaoh Necho II sent help to the Assyrian army that had entrenched itself in Harran. So Nabopolassar seems to have asked the Medes for help. The Medes reappeared on the scene in 610 BCE, when they joined the Babylonians for an assault on Harran. Faced with the formidable alliance, the Assyrians and their Egyptian allies abandoned Harran, which was captured. After that, the Medes then departed for the last time and we know of their activities largely from classical sources. In 605 BCE, the Babylonians marched to Carchemish and conquered it, completely defeating the Assyrians and Egyptians. It is not clear whether the Medes also participated in this final defeat of the Assyrians.

The outcome of the fall of Assyria for Median territorial expansion is unknown, but the Babylonian Chronicle and other evidence imply that most of the former Assyrian territory came under Babylonian control. Mario Liverani argues against the notion that the Medes and Babylonians shared Assyrian territory; instead, the Medes simply took over the Zagros, which Assyria had already lost earlier. Until recently, it was a common opinion that, following the fall of Assyria, the Medes took possession of the Assyrian lands east of the Tigris River, as well as the Harran region. This view is partially based on a text from the Babylonian king Nabonidus, indicating that the Medes dominated Harran for 54 years until the third year of his reign, and later classical sources. In this case, the Medes held Harran from 607 to 553 BCE. However, some scholars argue that the heart of Assyria and Harran remained under Babylonian control from 609 BCE until the fall of the Neo-Babylonian Empire in 539 BCE. It is true that, judging by the Babylonian Chronicle, Harran remained under Babylonian rule while the Medes returned to their land. However, it is possible that some time after 609 BCE, the Medes took Harran again and remained there for a long period.

=== Existence of a Median Empire ===
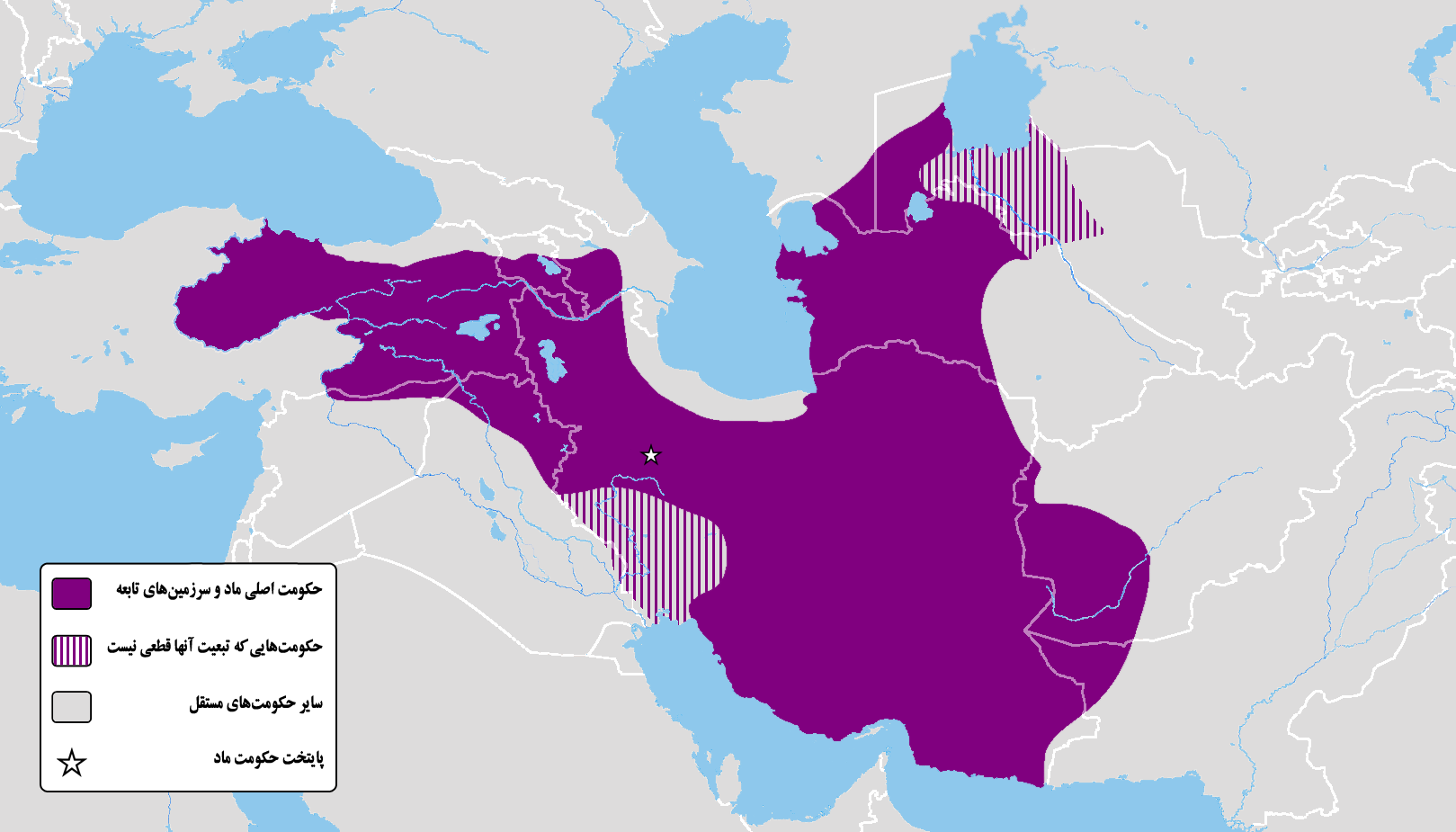
Hypothetical map of the maximum extent of the Median Empire

By the late 7th century BCE, the Medes appear to have coalesced into a significant political entity under a monarch, as evidenced by the Medo-Babylonian conquest of Assyria. Nothing is known about the Median socio-political structure, and scholars differ sharply in what they infer from some rather ambiguous evidence. Some posit the existence of a highly developed empire, strongly influenced by Assyrian imperial practices. In contrast, others, underscoring the lack of concrete evidence, lean towards viewing the Medes as certainly a potent force, but never developing any state institutions. It is in the period between the fall of Nineveh in 612 BCE and the conquest of the Median capital Ecbatana by the Persians in 550 BCE that the existence of a powerful Median Empire is postulated. However, contemporary sources about the Medes in this period are scarce. In any case, the available evidence in Babylonian and biblical sources indicates that the Medes played a significant political role in the ancient Near East after the fall of Assyria. Four powers dominated the ancient Near East from then on: Babylon, Media, Lydia, and, further south, Egypt.

The Medes seem soon to have established a common frontier with Lydia in central Anatolia. According to Herodotus, hostilities between the Medes and Lydians began five years before a battle precisely dated by an eclipse to 585 BCE. If this account holds true, it implies that before 590 BCE, the Medes had already subjugated Mannea and Urartu. Julian Reade proposed that the Babylonian Chronicle's entry for 609 BCE might refer to a Median assault on Urartu rather than a Babylonian one. This event, occurring shortly before Babylonian attacks in 608 and possibly 607 BCE, could indicate that the Babylonians provided support for Median expansion westward onto the Anatolian plateau. Another hypothesis is that, as early as 615 BCE, Cyaxares and Nabopolassar had forged a plan to destroy both Urartu and Assyria. Little is known about the end of Urartu as written sources end after 640 BCE. While the Cimmerians and the Medes are postulated as responsible for the end of Urartu, the general consensus is that Urartu was destroyed by the Medes in the late 7th century BCE.

In the early 7th century BCE, the Cimmerians invaded the Caucasus and Anatolia. While the Cimmerians settled in the plains of Cappadocia, the kingdom of Lydia was emerging in Anatolia, with its capital in Sardis. The Lydian kings repelled the Cimmerian invasion and initiated an eastward offensive, gradually approaching Cappadocia. The Cimmerian power, once great and significant in Cappadocia, collapsed almost simultaneously with Urartu. This created an opportunity for the Medes, who, after conquering Urartu, entered Asia Minor, subjugating Cappadocia. This region might have been familiar to them, as Assyrian texts from the 7th century BCE describe the situation in Anatolia west of the Euphrates similarly to the Zagros region. Herodotus recounts that Cyaxares sent an embassy to Lydia to demand the extradition of Scythian fugitives from Media, but the Lydian monarch Alyattes refused, leading to war between the two kingdoms. The war between the Medes and Lydians resulted in a series of conflicts over five years, with both sides experiencing alternating victories. In the sixth year of the conflict, a solar eclipse interrupted a battle, leading both sides to conclude a peace treaty mediated by Labynetus of Babylon and Syennesis I of Cilicia. As a result, the Halys River was established as the border between the two powers. The treaty was sealed by the marriage of Aryenis, daughter of Alyattes, and Astyages, son of Cyaxares, establishing a new balance of power among the Near Eastern states.

Herodotus states that Cyaxares subjugated all of Asia east of the river Halys, suggesting that he engaged in a series of battles with various peoples in the region to subdue them. This assertion may imply that, in addition to Cappadocia and Urartu, the Iberians, Macrones, Mushki, Marres, Mossynoeci and Tibareni were subdued by Cyaxares. Later indirect evidence suggests that the Medes may have conquered Hyrcania, Parthia, Sagartia, Drangiana, Aria and Bactria, becoming an empire that stretched from Anatolia in the west to Central Asia in the east. Whatever the political role of the Medes in the east, the representation of an Indian embassy at the court of Cyaxares (Xenophon, Cyropaedia 2.4.1) seems a plausible outcome of commercial contacts.

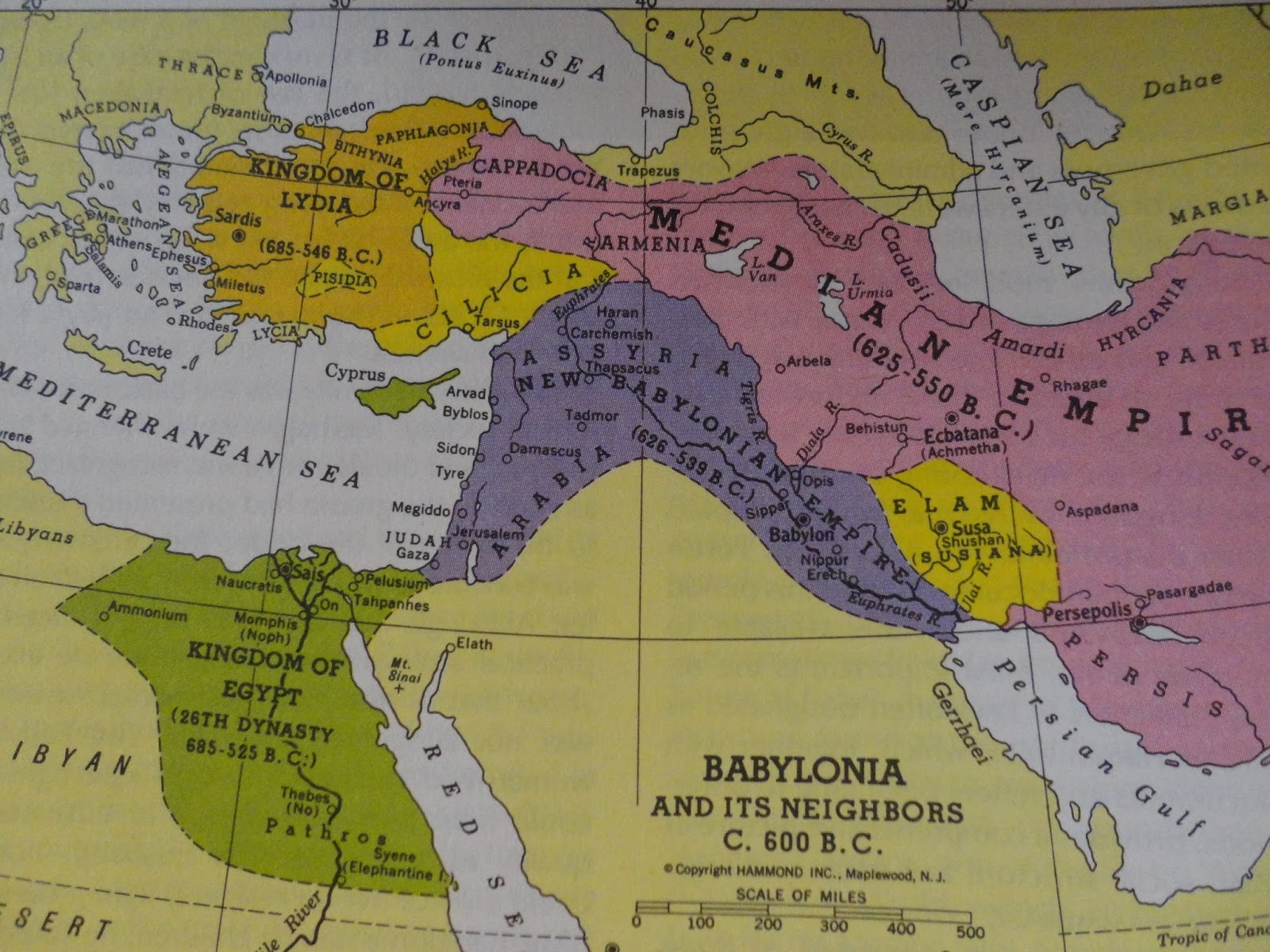
Ancient Near East in c. 600 BCE

Cyaxares died shortly after the treaty with the Lydians, leaving the throne to his son Astyages. Compared to Cyaxares, little is known about the reign of Astyages. His marriage to Aryenis made him the brother-in-law of the future Lydian king Croesus, and the marriage of his sister Amytis to the Babylonian king Nebuchadnezzar II (r. 605–562 BCE) made him the brother-in-law of the latter as well. However, not everything was well with the alliance with Babylon, and there is some evidence suggesting that Babylon may have feared the power of the Medes. The relations between Babylonia and Media seem to have deteriorated since in the 590s BCE it was expected that the Medes would invade Babylonian territory, as can be seen from the speeches of Jeremiah. According to Herodotus, Astyages married his daughter Mandane to the Persian king Cambyses I, with whom she would have a son, Cyrus II, connecting the Median dynasty to the Achaemenid dynasty. This marriage would have taken place before 576 BCE, but there is some doubt about its historicity.

During his reign, Astyages may have worked to strengthen and centralize the Median state, contrary to the will of the tribal nobility. This may have contributed to the downfall of the kingdom. According to Ctesias, the Median kings also fought wars against the Cadusians and the Sacae, although there is no hard evidence to back this up. Nevertheless, the reference to a war against the Sacae might indicate continued challenges from nomadic incursions, while the narrative about the war against the Cadusians might indicate that the Medes had limited control over the southern shores of the Caspian Sea, where the Cadusians lived. Apparently, Astyages's reign was relatively undisturbed until shortly before its end. Moses of Chorene claims that he engaged in a long struggle with an Armenian king named Tigranes, but little credit can be given to these statements.

=== Conquest by the Persians ===
Both Herodotus and Ctesias depict the Medo-Persian conflict as a protracted rebellion led by the Persian king Cyrus II against his Median overlord. However, the notion of Median overlordship over Persia lacks support from contemporary evidence. According to the Nabonidus Chronicle, in 550 BCE, the Median king Astyages marched with his troops against Cyrus of Persia "for conquest". However, his own soldiers revolted, captured him, and handed him over to Cyrus. Subsequently, Cyrus captured the Median capital of Ecbatana. The basic details of this account align with the detailed narrative of the Median king's treachery and despotism in Herodotus. That the confrontation is likely to have been longer than the concise chronicle entry conveys is indicated by an inscription from Sippar where the Babylonian king Nabonidus seems to refer to a conflict between Persians and Medes already in 553 BCE.

In Herodotus's narrative, Cyrus, in addition to being a vassal of Media, was the grandson of Astyages. Babylonian sources, however, do not mention this; they refer to Cyrus only as "the king of Anshan" (i.e., Persia), while Astyages is called the "king of the Medes". Herodotus reports that the Median general Harpagus organized a conspiracy against Astyages, and during a battle, he defected with a large part of the troops to the side of Cyrus. Astyages himself commanded the army in the battle, but the Medes were defeated, and their king was taken prisoner. The deeper cause of the Median army's rebellion might have been dissatisfaction with Astyages's policies. In the 6th century BCE, Iranian tribes became increasingly settled, and their leaders no longer resembled early tribal chiefs but began to behave like kings. When Astyages started punishing some of these tribal leaders, a revolt became inevitable.

After the capture of Astyages, Cyrus marched to Ecbatana and took the city's valuables to Anshan. As the extent of the territory the Medes controlled is disputed, we do not know what exactly Cyrus gained by his victory. Taking control of Media may have implied taking control of vassal states like Armenia, Cappadocia, Parthia, Drangiana, and Aria. If Cyrus was indeed the grandson of Astyages as Herodotus claims, then this would explain why the Medes accepted his reign. However, it is also possible that the connection between Cyrus and Astyages was invented to justify Persian rule over the Medes. According to Ctesias, Astyages had a daughter named Amytis, who was married to Spitamas, who then became the presumptive successor to his father-in-law. After killing Spitamas, Cyrus would have married Amytis to gain legitimacy. Although the authenticity of Ctesias's account is questionable, it is very likely that Cyrus married a daughter of the Median king.

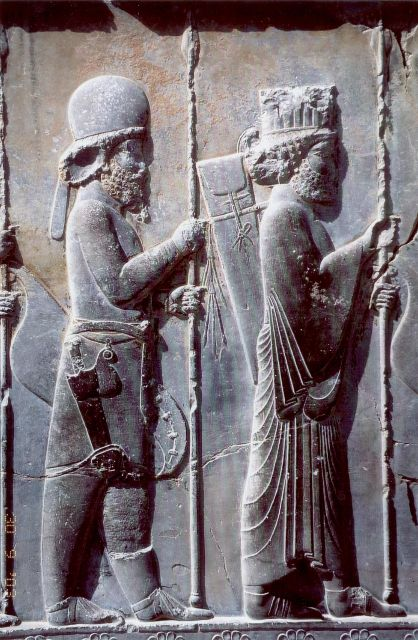
Achaemenid bas-relief from the 5th century BCE showing a Median soldier behind a Persian soldier

After Astyages's defeat, the Lydian king Croesus crossed the Halys River in hopes of expanding his borders to the east. This resulted in a war, leading Lydia to be conquered by the Persians. Subsequently, Cyrus conquered Babylon, putting an end to three powers in the Ancient Near East: Media, Lydia, and Babylon, all within a decade. In the Achaemenid Empire, Media retained a privileged position, ranking second after Persia itself. Media was a large province, and its capital, Ecbatana, became one of the Achaemenid capitals and the summer residence of the Persian kings. Persian rule in Media was shaken by a major revolt at the beginning of the reign of Darius the Great, who seized power after killing the usurper Gaumata. This event was followed by a series of rebellions in the Achaemenid satrapies. When Darius suppressed these rebellions and stayed in Babylon, a certain Phraortes made an attempt to seize power and restore Median independence. He claimed to be a descendant of Cyaxares and managed to seize Ecbatana in December 522 BCE. Around the same time, there was a new rebellion in Elam, and there were rebellions in adjacent provinces such as Armenia, Assyria, and Parthia. In the spring, the Persian leader invaded Media from the west, and in May 521 BCE, defeated Phraortes. The Persian victory was complete, and Phraortes fled to Parthia but was captured in Rages (modern Tehran). Later, the rebel was tortured and crucified in Ecbatana. After his victory, Darius could send troops to Armenia and Parthia, where his generals managed to defeat the remaining rebels. A Sagartian named Tritantechmes, who also claimed to be a descendant of Cyaxares, continued the rebellion but was also defeated. This is the last Median rebellion against Achaemenid rule. After the end of the Achaemenid Empire, Media continued to have great importance under the later Seleucid and Parthian empires.

== Historicity ==
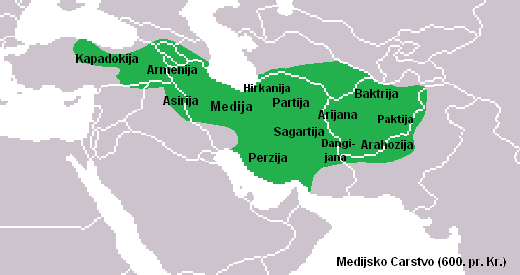
Map of the Median Empire as generally conceived during the period of its maximum extent, but in reality very hypothetical

Until the late 20th-century, scholarship generally agreed that the collapse of the Assyrian Empire was followed by the emergence of a Median empire. The Median empire was said to resemble the later Achaemenid Empire and to have ruled over a vast area of the Ancient Near East for half a century until its last king, Astyages, was overthrown by his own vassal, Cyrus the Great. In 1988, 1994, and 1995, historian Heleen Sancisi-Weerdenburg questioned the existence of a Median Empire as a political entity possessing structures comparable to the Neo-Assyrian, Neo-Babylonian, or Achaemenid Empires. She cast doubts on the overall validity of our most important source, namely Herodotus's Medikos Logos, and pointed to gaps in non-classical sources, especially for the first half of the 6th century BCE. Sancisi-Weerdenburg highlighted that virtually only Greek classical sources were used by modern historiography to construct Median history, and that ancient Near Eastern sources were almost fully ignored. She argued that there is no direct or substantial indirect evidence, not from Herodotus, supporting the existence of a Median Empire, and that such an empire is a Greek construction. In 2001, an international symposium was held in Padua, Italy, focused on the issue of the Median Empire. While no consensus was reached on the existence of a Median Empire, it was generally agreed that there was no conclusive proof for its existence. The debate continues to the present day.

Around 650 BCE, information about the Assyrian provinces in the Zagros was considerably reduced, and Assyrian sources no longer mention the Medes. When the Medes reappear in contemporary records in 615 BCE, they are attacking Assyria. There is no indication of how Cyaxares brought a unified Median force to such effective and devastating use. Currently, two contrasting academic views exist: the traditional perspective sees Cyaxares as the king of a unified Median state confronting Assyria as an equal power, while the alternative view considers the Medes as a military force that contributed to the fall of Assyria but lacked political cohesion. The absence of relevant Assyrian evidence after 650 BCE does not rule out the existence of a broader Median authority centered in Ecbatana. Some theories suggest that tribute demands and commercial exploitation along the Great Khurasan Road may have contributed to the accumulation of wealth by Median chiefs, prompting an ambitious individual to seek broader authority. Alternatively, conflicts among Median chiefs led to Assyrian intervention in 676 BCE and the oath of allegiance in 672 BCE. Assyrian concerns about potential threats from the Medes, Scythians, and Cimmerians during this period may have created an opportunity for the emergence of a dominant leader. The attack on Assyria from 615 to 610 BCE likely played a crucial role in consolidating the authority of this leader. David Stronach argues that there is not enough reason to posit the existence of a robust, independent, and unified Median kingdom at any date before 615 BCE. However, he disagrees with extending this negative assessment to the period from 615 to the mid-6th century BCE. For the period from 615 to 550 BCE, Babylonian sources contain two important pieces of information that align with Herodotus's account: in 615-610 BCE, the Medes, united under the leadership of Cyaxares, destroyed Assyrian capitals; in 550 BCE, the Median army, led by Astyages, defected to the Persian king Cyrus, followed by the conquest of Ecbatana. Thus, the beginning and end of an independent Median kingdom seem to be present, although the nature of such a kingdom is not necessarily equal to that described by Herodotus as a true empire foreshadowing the Achaemenid Empire. It is likely that a unified Median kingdom exerted control over a significant part of northern Iran, at least in the first half of the 6th century BCE. However, some scholars have also raised doubts about the existence of a unified, short-lived Median kingdom. Historian Mario Liverani proposed that there was no transition from city lords to regional rulers or kings; instead, there was a brief unification under a primary Median king, specifically to confront a weakened Assyria in the 610s BCE, followed by a rapid return to the previous status quo. Nevertheless, this view is not widely accepted.

While some scholars still argue there is archaeological evidence for Media being a powerful and structured empire that would have influenced the Achaemenid Empire, concrete archaeological evidence for such an empire is lacking. Others view the Median Empire as a fiction created by Herodotus to fill a gap between the Assyrian and Persian Empires in his vision of a sequence of Eastern empires. Karen Radner concluded that, without Herodotus and the Greek tradition, it is "highly doubtful" that modern researchers would posit the existence of a Median Empire. Heleen Sancisi-Weerdenburg expressed this view when she said that "the Median Empire exists for us because Herodotus says it did". An alternative view suggests a loose confederation of tribes capable of causing devastating effects, such as the conquest of Assyria, but lacking centralized imperial structures, mechanisms, and bureaucracies of control. This confederation would operate through loose alliances and dependencies driven by momentarily overlapping goals and ambitions. If any organized and stable authority existed, it would likely be centered in the central Zagros region, between Lake Urmia and Elam. While this hypothesis is sustainable and plausible, it remains a probability since textual evidence is inconclusive. Although archaeological evidence supports many judgments based on textual sources, at least for the period until around 650 BCE, there is still enough uncertainty for the period after 650 BCE. Reconsidering the Medes as a confederation or coalition, rather than a "traditional" empire, aligns with the limited evidence, but such reconsideration does not necessarily diminish their importance in the history of the Ancient Near East.

According to Matt Waters, the existing evidence shows a Median king exerting influence or authority directly or indirectly over many peoples through a hierarchical and informal system of governance, without the existence of a formal "Median Empire" — meaning a centralized and bureaucratic structure. In the 590s BCE, Jeremiah mentions 'the kings of the Medes' (51:11) and 'the kings of the Medes, their governors (pechah), all their officials (sagan), and all the lands (eretz) of their dominion (memshalah)' (51:27-28). The plurality of "kings" is remarkable (although the Septuagint uses the singular "king"); whether the fact that Jeremiah (25:25) also lists "all the kings of Elam and Media" among the condemned nations shows that the plural and singular are rhetorically interchangeable is debatable. A possible explanation may be found in Nabonidus's references to the "Ummān-manda, their country, and the kings who march at their side." Nabonidus is pointing to a unitary threat, composed of components that include a plurality of kings. Jeremiah's formula may be an alternative way of expressing this, especially since the Hebrew prophet is not concerned with the complexities of the situation. The descriptions by Nabonidus and Jeremiah are consistent with Herodotus's depiction of Median dominance in 1.134:

When the Medes were in power, in the same way, the nations ruled one another. The Medes ruled all together, and (directly) those who lived closest; and these, in turn, ruled their neighbors and so on, following the same principle by which the Persians esteem others. Thus, indeed, it progressed, each nation ruling and being ruled (by its neighbor).

== Organization ==
Ruler	Period				Note
Ruler	*Herodotus	*George Cameron	*Edvin A. Grantovski	*I. M. Diakonoff	Note
Deioces	700−647 BCE	728−675 BCE	672−640 BCE	700−678 BCE	Son of Phraortes
Phraortes	647−625 BCE	675−653 BCE	640−620 BCE	678−625 BCE	Son of Deioces
Madyes	X	653−625 BCE	635−615 BCE	X	Scythian interregnum
Cyaxares	625−585 BCE	625−585 BCE	620−584 BCE	625−585 BCE	Son of Phraortes
Astyages	585−550 BCE	585−550 BCE	584−550 BCE	585−550 BCE	Son of Cyaxares
All chronological estimates are from Encyclopedia Iranica (Media - Median Dynasty)

=== Administrative management ===
Currently, there's a lack of direct information about the political, economic, and social structure of the Medes. However, it is likely that in many aspects, the Median administrative system resembled that of the Assyrians, under whose influence the Medes were for a long period. Some elements of the administrative system introduced by the Assyrians may have persisted in the Median provinces even after the fall of Assyria. Instead of being a centralized monarchy, the Median state was more like a confederation with various rulers. The Median governance system favored a pyramidal structure of loyalty, where small rulers pledged allegiance to a provincial king, who, in turn, owed loyalty to the central court in Ecbatana. This system somewhat resembled the satrapal and feudal systems. The exercise of authority over various Iranian and non-Iranian peoples in the form of a confederation is implied by the ancient Iranian royal title "king of kings".

Jeremiah speeches dating from 593 BCE mentions "kings of Media" in the plural, alongside satraps and governors. Herodotus gives this characterization of the structure of the Median kingdom (1, 134): "... one people ruled another, but the Medes ruled over all and especially over those that dwelt nearest them, and these ruled over their neighbours, and they again over theirs". Some scholars assume that the later Median administrative structure evolved into a more developed form in the administrative system of the Achaemenid Empire.

Probably, there never was a Median Empire strictu sensu. Therefore, the term "empire" to refer to the political entity constructed by the Medes might not be suitable. The Median kingdom was probably just a loose federation of western Iranian chieftains and kings and their unity was maintained by their personal ties with the Median king, who was less an absolute monarch than a first among equals. This fits the description of other rulers "who march at the side" of the Median king mentioned in Babylonian sources. Maria Brosius envisions Media as a territory of chiefdoms that, between 614 and 550 BCE, united their military forces under a city lord, with Ecbatana as their power base.

=== Royal court ===
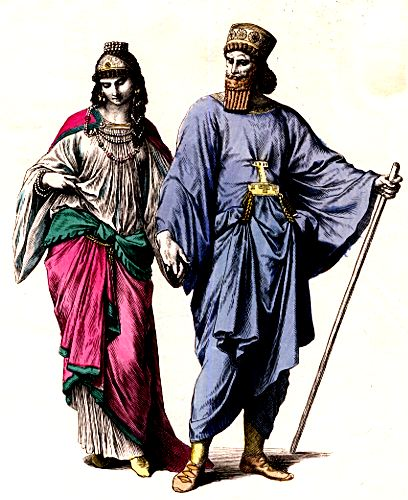
Artistic representation of noble Medes

Available information about the Median court is limited and not entirely reliable. In his charming account of the youth of Cyrus II, Herodotus suggests that the Median court included bodyguards, messengers, the "king's eye" (a kind of secret agent), and builders. Ctesias mentions the royal cupbearer as one of the positions at the Median court. When founding the Achaemenid Empire, Cyrus likely continued the organization and practices of the Median court, including forms of etiquette, ceremony, and diplomatic protocol that the Medes, in turn, inherited from Assyria.

According to Herodotus, as soon as he ascended the throne, Deioces ordered the construction of a fortress city to be his capital; all governmental authority was centralized in this city, Ecbatana. He established a royal guard, and a very strict court protocol, in such a way that the heads of the great Median families ”took him for a being of a different nature from themselves.” In normal circumstances, the monarch remained isolated in his palace, and no one could see him unless formally requesting an audience and being presented to the royal presence by an official. He was surrounded by bodyguards for personal security and rarely left his palace, relying on reports about the state of his kingdom transmitted to him occasionally by his officials. No one could laugh or spit in the royal presence or in the presence of anyone else, as such acts were considered unworthy and shameful. Having consolidated royal authority, Deioces proceeded to administer justice with severity. Legal cases were sent to him in writing, he judged them and returned them with the sentence. He established law and order by introducing "observers and listeners" throughout his kingdom, monitoring the actions of his subjects. Like other oriental rulers, the Median monarch had multiple wives and concubines, and polygamy was commonly practiced among the wealthier and prominent classes. The main characteristics of the Median court may have been similar to the Assyrian court.

According to Herodotus, the Magi were a highly influential priestly caste at the court, considered honorable by both the king and the people. They served as interpreters of dreams, sorcerers, and advisors on various matters, including political affairs. They were responsible for the religious ceremonies, and high state offices were likely granted to them. The court's primary entertainment was hunting, often taking place in a forest where lions, leopards, bears, boars, antelopes, gazelles, wild asses, and deer could be found. As usual, these animals were pursued on horseback and targeted with bows or spears.

=== Army ===
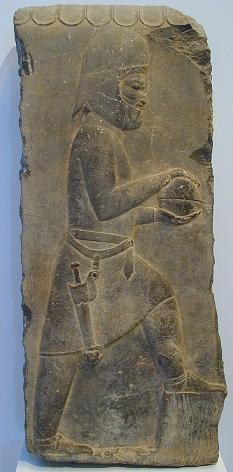
Achaemenid relief of a Median soldier, found in Persepolis

Little is known about the Median army, but it certainly played a significant role in Median history. In the late 7th century BCE, the Medes made notable military progress under Cyaxares, who, according to Herodotus, organized the army into special units: infantry, spearmen, archers, and horsemen, as the previous mixed genders led to confusion in the army on the battlefield. Before Cyaxares, it appears that the Medes went to war in tribal organization, with each chief bringing and leading their infantry and mounted troops. The king trained the forces into an army divided into tactical groups with unified weapons. The Medes used chariots less frequently and relied mainly on cavalry equipped with Nisean horses. Their martial equipment included the spear, bow, sword, and dagger. The mountainous nature of their country and its martial character contributed to the development of suitable attire for cavalry: tight trousers typically made of leather with an extra belt for a short sword, a long tight leather tunic, a round felt helmet with cheek flaps and a neck protector, possibly covering the mouth, and a long variegated cloak thrown over the shoulders and fastened to the chest with empty sleeves hanging at the sides. The Median attire quickly gained popularity among other Iranian peoples. The presence of Median soldiers in Assyrian palaces evidently significantly influenced the restructuring of Median military tactics, adopting more advanced techniques. The Median cavalry was highly trained and well-equipped, playing a crucial role in battles against the Assyrians.

Occupying the second most important position in the Achaemenid Empire, the Medes paid less tribute but provided more soldiers to the Achaemenid army than other peoples. This is evidenced by the reliefs of Persepolis and Herodotus, as well as the fact that many Median generals, such as Harpagus, Mazares, and Datis, served in the Persian army. According to Herodotus, during the Greco-Persian Wars, Median soldiers did not differ much from the Persians. Both fought on horseback and on foot using spears, bows, and daggers, large wicker shields, and carrying quivers on their backs. The original characteristics of the Median army, as indicated in the Hebrew Bible and by Xenophon, are simpler than Herodotus's description. The Median army seems to have been based on horse archery. Trained in a variety of equestrian exercises and the use of the bow, the Medes advanced against their enemies on horseback, similar to the Scythians, and achieved their victories primarily through their skill in shooting arrows while advancing or retreating. They also used swords and spears, but the terror inspired by the Medes arose from their exceptional archery abilities.

=== Economy ===
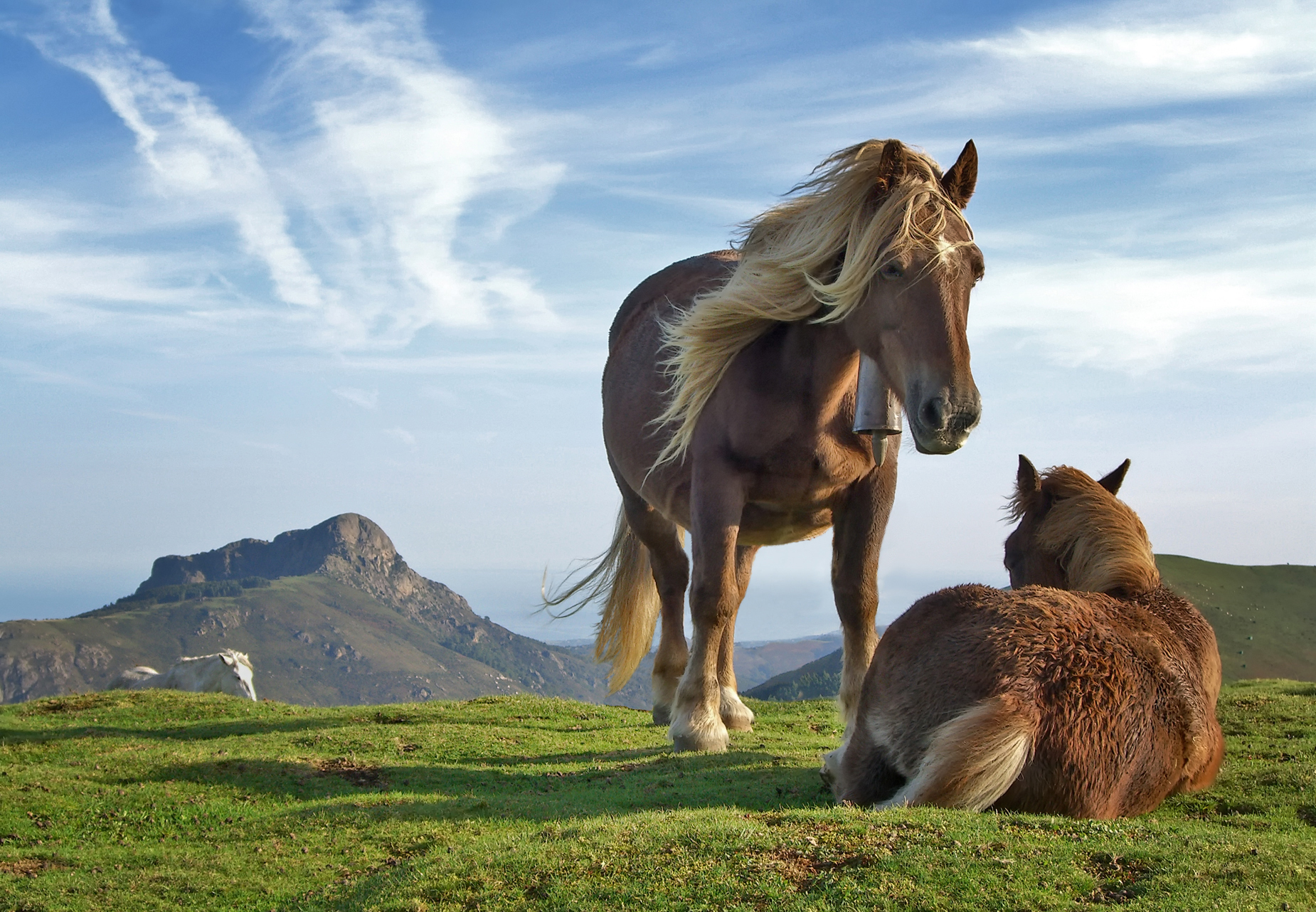
Horse breeding was one of the main branches of the Median economy

The Medes had a pastoral lifestyle, with their primary economic activity being animal husbandry, including cattle, sheep, goats, donkeys, mules, and horses. Horses were particularly prized, as Assyrian cuneiform texts on Assyrian incursions into Media show that the Medes bred an excellent breed of horses. In Assyrian reliefs, the Medes are sometimes depicted wearing what appears to be sheepskin cloaks over their tunics and high-laced boots, equipment necessary for pastoral work in the plateaus where winters brought snow and intense cold. Archaeological evidence shows that the Medes possessed skilled workers in bronze and gold.

The archaeological material from sites like Tepe Nush-i Jan and Godin Tepe, as well as Assyrian reliefs, demonstrate that in the first half of the first millennium BCE, there were urban-type settlements in various regions of Media, serving as centers for craft production and a sedentary agricultural and livestock economy. From Median territories, the Assyrians received tribute in the form of horses, cattle, sheep, Bactrian camels, lapis lazuli, bronze, gold, silver, and other metals, as well as linen and wool fabrics. In the favored regions of Media in the Zagros and Azerbaijan, the soil was almost entirely cultivable and capable of producing an excellent grain harvest. South of the Caspian Sea, there was a narrow strip of fertile soil covered by a dense forest, providing excellent-quality wood. The economy of the villages relied on crops such as barley, spelt, wheat bread, peas, lentils, and grapes. The densely forested mountains offered an extensive range of hunting, but animal husbandry remained noble. The sample of domestic bones in Nush-i Jan includes nine species, with sheep, goats, pigs, and cattle being the most common. There are also indications, in line with the millennia-old reputation of Media's pastures, that the aforementioned horse breeding played a significant role in the local economy.

Hilary Gopnik see the Median state as a “dominant economic force” in control of the trade routes of the northern Zagros in the late 7th and 6th centuries. As Medes, being the most powerful people on the Iranian plateau in the first half of the 6th century BCE, may have demanded tribute from peoples such as the Persians, Armenians, Parthians, Drangians, and Arians. The importance of Media is primarily related to controlling a substantial portion of the east-west route known in the Middle Ages as the Silk Road. This route connected the Eastern and Western worlds, linking Media to Babylon, Assyria, Armenia, and the Mediterranean in the west, as well as to Parthia, Aria, Bactria, Sogdiana, and China in the east. Another important road connected Ecbatana with the Persian capitals, Persepolis and Pasargadae. In addition to controlling east-west trade, Media was also rich in agricultural products. The valleys of the Zagros were fertile, and Media was well-known for its crops, sheep, and goats. The country could sustain a large population and boasted many villages and some cities like Rages and Gabae.

Assyrian texts mention wealthy Median cities, but the recorded plunder mainly consisted of weapons, cattle, donkeys, horses, camels, and occasionally lapis lazuli, obtained through Median trade further east. Around the time of their unification or shortly afterward, it seems that the Medes acquired means to supply themselves with more substantial wealth. This is inferred from a passage in the Babylonian Chronicle from the 6th century BCE, which mentions that king Cyrus II took silver, gold, goods, and properties from Ecbatana as spoils to Anshan.

== Territorial extension ==
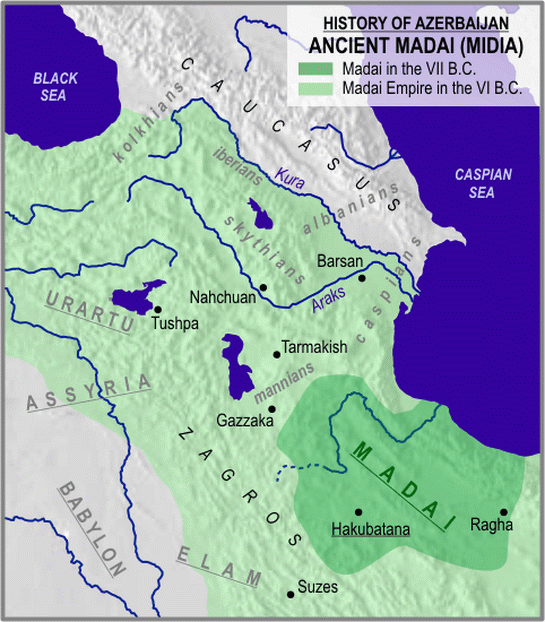
Original territory of the Medes before their expansion

The borders of Media changed gradually over time, resulting in a geographical extension whose precise details remain unknown. The original territory of Media, as known by the Assyrians from the late 9th century to the early 7th century BCE, was bordered to the north by Gizilbunda, located in the Qaflankuh Mountain Range north of the Hamadan plain. To the west and northwest, Media did not extend beyond the Hamadan plain and was bordered by the Zagros Mountains, except in the southwest, where Media occupied the Zagros Valley, and its border extended to the Garrin Mountain, separating it from the kingdom of Ellipi, located south of Kermanshah. To the south, it bordered the Elamite region of Simaški, corresponding to the current Lorestan province. To the east and southeast, Media seems to have been delimited by the Dasht-e Kavir desert. Patusarra and Mount Bikni were probably the remotest territories of Media that the Assyrians penetrated during their greatest expansion in the second half of the 8th century and the early decades of the 7th century BCE. Scholars typically identify Bikni with Mount Damavand, northeast of Tehran. However, others identify it with Mount Alvand, immediately west of Hamadan. If this identification is correct, it means that the Assyrians never crossed this mountain, and all the Media territory they conquered or knew was west of Hamadan. The archaeological evidence available is limited, but the easternmost site with potentially Median pottery is Tepe Ozbaki, situated 75 km west of Tehran, so it is probable that Media extended at least that far east.

In the 6th century and later, much of northern Iran and some neighboring territories were attributed to Media. This was the result of Median conquests in the second half of the 7th century BCE. It is commonly assumed that after the fall of Assyria in 612 BCE, the Medes took control of a vast area extending from the vicinity of Tehran in the east to the Halys River in the west. Thus, the "Median Empire" would have ruled over Iran, Armenia, eastern Anatolia, and northern Mesopotamia, while the Babylonians controlled southern Mesopotamia and the Levant. However, there are doubts about this assumed extensive territorial expansion.

=== Median expansion ===
According to Herodotus, Phraortes was able to extend the Median kingdom by conquering Persia, which at that point was probably a fairly small state to the south of Media. The event is described as part of a broader wave of conquest, where Phraortes and his successors systematically subdued various princedoms along the Zagros range. However, the idea that Persia had been a "vassal" of Media rests on later classical sources only and is considered rather improbable by some scholars. In the Neo-Assyrian period, the main entity north of Elam was the kingdom of Ellipi, but its power seems to have declined, and it disappeared from historical records around 660 BCE. It's possible that, perhaps after the fall of Assyria, the Medes and Elamites might have filled the vacuum left by diminishing Ellipian power, but there is no historical evidence to indicate such. Relying on biblical sources, Zawadzki suggested Median dominance over Elam, as Elam would have been too weak after the Assyrian campaigns in the 640s. A similar conclusion, but with the acceptance of an earlier Babylonian domination, was reached by Dandamayev. Interpretations of passages from Jeremiah (Jer. 49:34-38) and Ezekiel (Ezek. 32:24-25), which hint at Elam being subjugated, are difficult and likely not intended as precise historical statements. Since textual and archaeological evidence from Iran does not lend any support to a Median domination of Khuzestan and both biblical and Babylonian sources do not explicitly mention Media's overlordship over Elam, the idea faces much skepticism.

The Median kingdom probably annexed Mannaea to its territory in the aftermath of the Assyrians' defeat in a battle in 616 BCE. The Median involvement with Assyria from 615 to 610 is marked by three, possibly four, campaigns, each of which concluded with the sack of an important city. The Medes' departure after each conquest suggests a lack of interest in political control over the heartland of the former Assyrian empire. Julian Reade posits that the Assyrian provinces within the Zagros, like Mazamua, and perhaps the upper Tigris regions of Tušhan and Šupria, were the only ones more suitable for Median expansion due to their familiarity to the Median territory. Nonetheless it is sometimes suggested that the Medes took control of the Assyrian heartland as claimed by later Greek sources. Herodotus (1, 106), writing about 450 BCE, that Cyaxares conquered all Assyria; whatever was meant by Assyria in this context, this may imply at most a remote suzerainty of the kind described by Herodotus (1, 134). Ctesias, around 400 BCE, mentions resettlement of Nineveh under Median rule. Xenophon, who travelled through the country in 401 BCE, regard metropolitan Assyria as part of Media. He also says that Nimrud and Nineveh were former Median cities conquered by the Persians. The relevance of these informations for the situation in the 6th century BCE is questionable. The Babylonian Chronicle records that in 547 the Persian king Cyrus passed through Arbela (modern Erbil) on his way to attack a kingdom whose name is damaged but which is often supposed to have been Lydia. It has been argued that the crossing of the Tigris downstream from Arbela is evidence that this region towards the Lesser Zab was controlled by the Persians suggesting previous Median control of the region, whereas the territory south of this river was Babylonian. However, it's possible that the Chronicle only mentions the route taken by Cyrus because he was passing through Babylonian territory, with or without permission. Xenophon's identification of the east bank of the Tigris north of Baghdad as 'Media' and Herodotus' mention of the lowland Matiene (5. 52. 5) remain questionable in terms of historical Median control west of the Zagros. The primary evidence of Median presence in the Mesopotamian lowlands any time after 610 BCE revolves around Harran. The Nabonidus inscriptions indicates that Harran was vulnerable to incursions by the Medes in the 550s BCE, although this may have occurred at other times. The Medes are described by Nabonidus as responsible for the destruction of the Ehulhul in Harran and as an impediment to his desired reconstruction work there. This implies that the Medes controlled the temple and thus Harran itself. However, the Babylonian Chronicle records the conquest of Harran in 610 BCE, and implies Babylonian control there. Some scholars favors the chronicle’s account, emphasizing the propagandistic elements of Nabonidus’ inscriptions. Around 550 BCE, Cyrus conquered Gutium, which suggests that there was a region in the Western Zagros not under Median control at that time, although the exact location of Gutium remains elusive. The role of Ugbaru of Gutium as a supporter of Cyrus may arise from Gutium having only recently rejected Median authority.

In a way, the extent of the supposed Median Empire was inferred from the territorial extent of the later Achaemenid Empire.

According to Herodotus, the Median control extended as far west as the Halys River where they allegedly shared a border with the Lydians. In contrast to the problem of who held political control over Harran, there is no contemporary sources that would attest a Median presence extending as far west as the Halys River. Historian Robert Rollinger acknowledges a Lydo-Median war. However, he questions the Halys frontier, pointing out Herodotus's problematic description of the course of the river and the absence of historical details in the account explaining how the Halys became the border between Lydian and Median domains. He concedes that the Medes might have been in Anatolia for a brief period and even entered into a treaty with the Lydians but dismisses the idea of permanent Median control in eastern and central Anatolia in the 6th century BCE. The demise of the Urartian kingdom remains unclear due to the lack of written sources after the 640s BCE. However, there seems to be a consensus that the kingdom was destroyed by the Medes, given the accepted border at the Halys River by many scholars. It is assumed that the Medes somehow managed to extend their dominion to the west. The destruction of Urartu by external forces has conventionally been dated to around 590 BCE, based on references in the Hebrew Bible and in Neo-Babylonian chronicles. S. Kroll, however, observed that the relevant texts might refer to a geographical region rather than a political state, and he suggests instead that the Urartian state disintegrated around 640 BCE after a Scythian invasion. Without any regional structure to resist military incursions, Babylonians invaded Urartu in 608-607 BCE, and perhaps 609 BCE, and later the Medes must have asserted their authority over the region. The Nabonidus Chronicle reports a campaign of Cyrus the Great in 547 BCE to a land for which only the first character is still recognisable in the text. Although there is ongoing debate, the prevailing interpretation identifies it as Lydia, reading the damaged character as Lu-. However, in 1997, Joachim Oelsner identified the sign as Ú, the first sign of Urartu. It is likely that Cyrus, after he had conquered Media, spent several years to establish his power under regions that had been previously under Median control. However, considering the view of fragility of the Median power on its western flank and reservations about the existence of a Median Empire, Rollinger concludes that Urartu likely survived the Median "episode" only to be conquered by Cyrus. But there might have been a period of Median supremacy or overlordship since the Behistun inscription treats revolts in the first year of Darius' reign in this region as part of the revolts in Media, dividing 'Media' into at least three parts: Media proper, Sagartia, and Urartu (Armenia).

Herodotus and Ctesias suggest that Median authority extended eastward, but the exact extent of the Medes' sway to the east remains uncertain. While reading Darius' Behistun Inscription to reconstruct a Media that under Astyages encompassed Media, Armenia and Sagartia seems reasonable enough, the inscription differentiates eastern regions that many would postulate as having been under Median authority based on classical sources. Parthia and Hyrcania, for example, are treated as separate entities. Many eastern areas that appear as parts of the Achaemenid Empire in the Behistun inscription find little or no mention in the sources relevant to the political history of the preceding fifty years, for example, Aria, Drangiana and Arachosia, among others. It remains unknown how and when these areas were incorporated into the Persian Empire. An early Achaemenid list places Media in the tenth position, followed by Armenia, Cappadocia, and Eastern Iranian provinces (Parthia, Drangiana, Aria, etc.). The inclusion of Armenia and Cappadocia in a section starting with Media and then extending eastward may be interpreted as a hint in the former Median territorial extension. According to Ctesias, Cyrus’ victory over Astyages led to the submission of the Hyrcanians, Parthians, Scythians, and Bactrians to Cyrus. According to Herodotus, when Cyrus conquered Media he was confronted in the east with the task of conquering the Massagetae, a nomad people of Central Asia, and Bactria in present-day Northern Afghanistan and Tajikistan. This suggest that the regions situated further west, Hyrcania, Parthia, Aria, Drangiana must have already belonged to the Medes. That Hyrcania and Parthia were possession of the Median empire is suggested by the fact that during the revolts of 522 BCE both regions supported the Median rebel Phraortes.

By one estimate, the area of the Median Empire might have covered a territory of just over 2,800,000 square kilometers, making it one of the largest empires in history. However, it is possible that it never exceeded the size of the Neo-Assyrian Empire, which at its peak covered 1,400,000 km². A recent reassessment of historical evidence, both archaeological and textual, has led many scholars to question previous notions about the territorial extent of the Medes. As a result, some scholars are removing many supposed "provinces" and "dependent kingdoms" from the composition of the "Median Empire", such as Persia, Elam, Assyria, northern Syria, Armenia, Cappadocia, Drangiana, Parthia, and Aria. Thus, the influence and territorial extent of the Median state was reduced to the territory adjacent to Ecbatana.

== Legacy ==
The formation of the Median kingdom is one of the decisive moments in Iranian history. It heralded the Aryan rise to dynastic power, shaping cultural and political life on the Iranian plateau and in other territories occupied by Iranians. Iranian peoples united for the first time, creating a political counterbalance to the major powers in the west, Lydia and Babylon. The Persian victory over Media constituted a step toward glory for Cyrus II, who then achieved a series of victories and founded the Achaemenid Empire, the largest and most powerful Iranian state in history. According to classical sources, the Persian victory over the Medes in 550 BCE granted Cyrus an already established empire, extending from the Halys River to Central Asia. Thus, the Achaemenid Empire was established based on a direct inheritance from the Median Empire. Some historians, analyzing Achaemenid administrative and palace vocabulary, suggest that Median loanwords were particularly frequent in royal titulature and bureaucracy. Additionally, it is hypothesized that the Medes indirectly transmitted Assyro-Babylonian and Urartian traditions to the Persians. The inference is that Cyrus assimilated into Median traditions, given Media's previous political supremacy.

Recently, several scholars have emphasized instead the crucial formative role played by the developed empires of the Near East, particularly Babylonia and more importantly Elam, in the articulation of the Achaemenid Empire. The notion that the Median Empire served as a conduit for transmitting Assyrian traditions to the Achaemenid Empire, impacting various aspects of art, architecture, and administration, has been questioned due to the "nebulous nature of the Median polity." While art and architecture show less problematic evidence for this proposed transmission chain, the aspect of administration and government is where Median contributions are more doubtful. The purported transmission of Assyrian influences to the Achaemenids via the Median Empire includes elements like the Assyrian postal service, the royal road, mass deportations, royal titles, the Assyrian system of provincial government, and a feudal system of land tenure. However, the Neo-Babylonian governmental and administrative system seems to have been very similar with the Neo-Assyrian system, making it a plausible link for Assyrian traditions influencing the Achaemenids. Assyrian cultural traits may have reached the Persians through north-western Iran even without the existence of a well-organized Median Empire.

Due to its localization, the Persians were very prone to Elamite influence, to the point that is thought that the Persians of the time of Cyrus comprised a population descended from a blending of Iranians and Elamites. The permanence of Elamites borrowing in every aspect of social and political life suggest that the organization of the Kingdom of Cyrus and his successors owes more to the Elamite legacy, which can be identified precisely, than to Median borrowings, which are very difficult to isolate. However, a major significance of the Median state, and its sway across Iran, however centralized or not, as a precursor to Achaemenid Persia cannot be overstressed. The role of Media in the Achaemenid Empire is quite peculiar. There is no definitive conclusion, but issues related to religious and social ideologies may have been the cause of this peculiarity. The Greeks tended to confuse Medes and Persians, and the term "Mede" was often used to refer to the "Persian." This terminology was the reaction of Anatolian Greeks to the successors of Cyrus II, later adopted by other Greeks, and is recurrent in the concept of Medism. This phenomenon likely stems from the Median nature of the territory that the Lydian king Croesus attempted to conquer and his justification for doing so, perhaps reinforced by memories of the fearsome nature of the Medes with whom his predecessor had managed to make a treaty. Besides the Greeks, Jews, Egyptians, and other peoples of the ancient world also called the Persians "Medes" and considered Persian rule a continuation of that of the Medes.

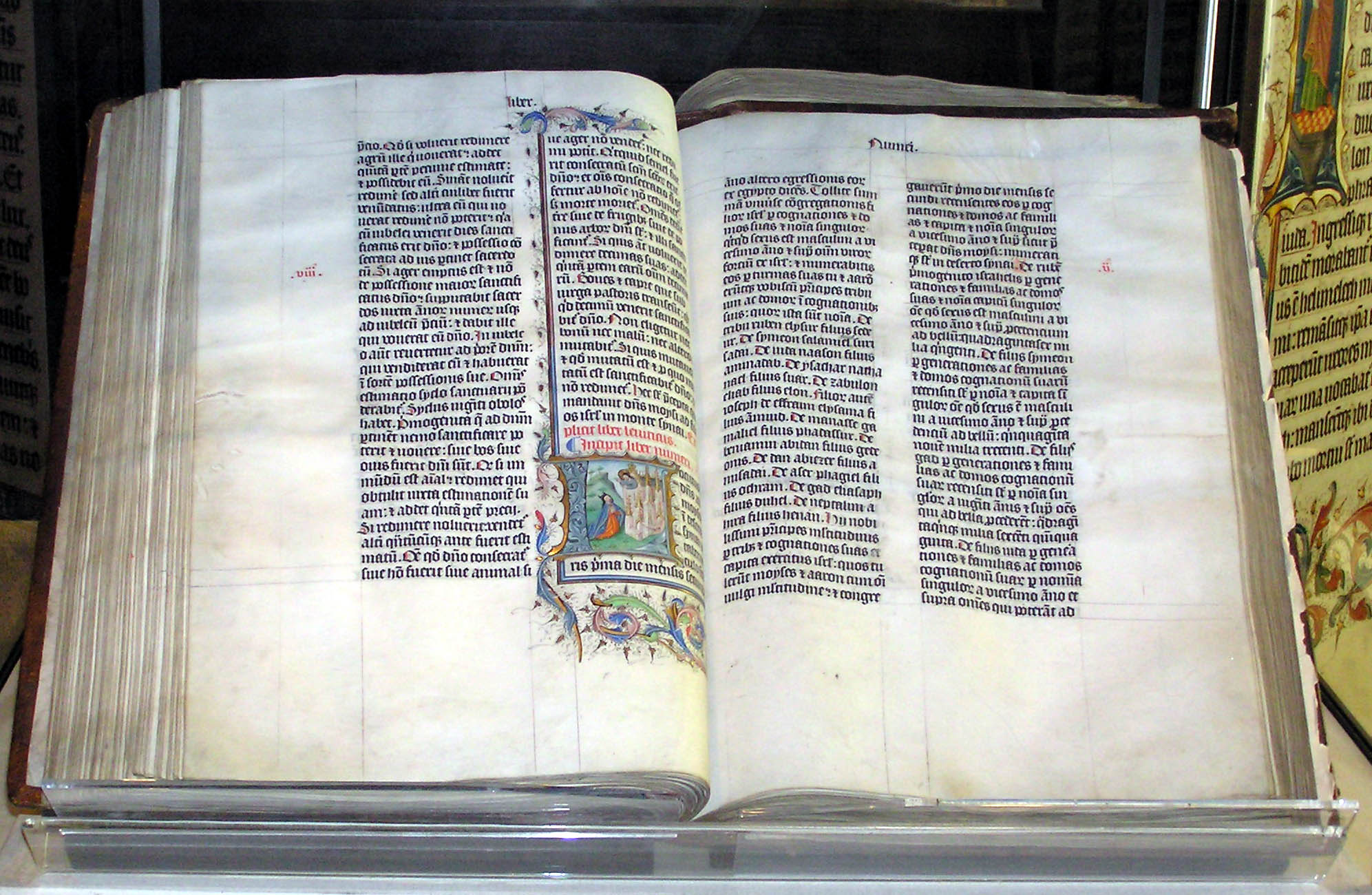
A handwritten Bible in Latin, on display at Malmesbury Abbey, Wiltshire, England

The biblical texts consider Media as a significant power. The books of Isaiah and Jeremiah portray the Medes as a potentially vicious and destructive enemy of Babylon. The book of Daniel mentions the vision of the four beasts, representing the ancient monarchies of the Ancient Near East that ruled the city of Babylon:

1. The lion with eagle's wings: Neo-Babylonian Empire;
2. The bear: Medo-Persian Empire;
3. The four-headed winged leopard: Macedonian Empire, later divided among the four generals of Alexander the Great;
4. The beast with ten horns and iron teeth: Roman Empire.

There is little doubt about this interpretation, but the problem lies precisely with the interpretation of the Median Empire, which never conquered Babylon and is only mentioned as a significant world empire in Greek texts. The book of Daniel mentions a ruler called Darius the Mede, who supposedly conquered Babylon, but this figure is unknown in other historical sources. It is highly probable that the author of Daniel, who wrote around 165 BCE, was influenced by the Greek view of history and therefore gave Media an exaggerated importance.

In the theory of imperial succession, Media comes after Assyria and before Persia, covering the period between 612 and 550 BCE. In Greek historiography, this scheme included the Assyrian Empire, Median Empire, Achaemenid Empire, and later, the Seleucid Empire was added to it. After Pompey's victory over the Seleucids in 63 BCE, Roman historians completed the concept of the four empires, including the Roman Empire as the fifth and final one. The Greeks considered the Median state as a universal empire, whose model corresponded to the Achaemenid and, in general, the Eastern model of the state. In the Hebrew tradition, the Babylonian Empire takes the place of the Assyrian Empire. However, neither Greco-Roman nor Hebrew traditions deprived Media of its prominent role in history. It's only in late Jewish and Christian literature that the second state was identified as the Medo-Persian Empire, thereby depriving the Medes of an independent role in world history.

== Bibliography ==
- Dandamayev, M.; Medvedskaya, I. (2006). "Media". Iranicaonline.org.online.org}}
- Rawlinson, George (2007) [1885]. The Seven Great Monarchies of the Ancient Eastern World. Vol. 7. New York: John B. Eldan Press. ISBN 978-1-931956-46-8.
- Rollinger, Robert (2021). "The Median Dilemma". In Jacobs, Bruno; Rollinger, Robert (eds.). A Companion to the Achaemenid Persian Empire. John Wiley & Sons. pp. 457–473. ISBN 978-1119174288.
- Boyce, Mary; Grenet, Frantz (1991). Zoroastrianism under Macedonian and Roman rule. Brill. ISBN 978-90-04-09271-6.
- Bryce, Trevor (2009). The Routledge Handbook of the Peoples and Places of Ancient Western Asia. From the Early Bronze Age to the Fall of the Persian Empire. Taylor & Francis. ISBN 978-0415394857.
- Dandamaev, M. A. (1989). A Political History of the Achaemenid Empire. Brill. ISBN 978-90-04-09172-6.
- Stierlin, Henri (2006). Splendeurs de I'Empire perse (in French). Paris: Grund. ISBN 978-2700015249.
- Henrickson, R. C. (1988). "Baba Jan Teppe". Encyclopaedia Iranica. Vol. 2. Routledge & Kegan Paul. ISBN 978-0-933273-67-2. Archived from the original on September 4, 2010.
- Tavernier, Jan (2007). Iranica in the Achaemenid Period (ca. 550-330 B.C.): Linguistic Study of Old Iranian Proper Names and Loanwords, Attested in Non-Iranian Texts. Peeters Publishers. ISBN 978-90-429-1833-7.
- Dandamaev, M. A.; Lukonin, V. G.; Kohl, Philip L.; Dadson, D. J. (2004). The Culture and Social Institutions of Ancient Iran. Cambridge, England: Cambridge University Press. p. 480. ISBN 978-0-521-61191-6.
- Brown, Stuart C. (1990). "Medien (Media)". Reallexicon der Assyriologie und Vorderasiatischen Archäologie (in German). Vol. 7. Berlin: De Gruyter. pp. 619–623.
- Diakonoff, I.M. (1985). "Media". In Gershevitch, Ilya (ed.). The Cambridge History of Iran. Vol. 2. Cambridge, England: Cambridge University Press. pp. 36–148. ISBN 978-0-521-20091-2.
- Gershevitch, I. (1968). "Old Iranian Literature". Iranian Studies. Hanbuch Der Orientalistik – Abeteilung – Der Nahe Und Der Mittlere Osten. Vol. 1. Brill. pp. 1–30. ISBN 978-90-04-00857-1.
- Levine, Louis D. (1973-01-01). "Geographical Studies in the Neo-Assyrian Zagros: I". Iran. 11: 1–27. doi:10.2307/4300482. ISSN 0578-6967. JSTOR 4300482.
- Levine, Louis D. (1974-01-01). "Geographical Studies in the Neo-Assyrian Zagros-II". Iran. 12: 99–124. doi:10.2307/4300506. ISSN 0578-6967. JSTOR 4300506.
- Van De Mieroop, Marc (2015). A History of the Ancient Near East, ca. 3000-323 BC. Wiley Blackwell.
- Soudavar, Abolala (2003). The aura of kings: legitimacy and divine sanction in Iranian kingship. Mazda Publishers. ISBN 978-1-56859-109-4.
- Young, T. Cuyler Jr. (1988). "The early history of the Medes and the Persians and the Achaemenid empire to the death of Cambyses". In Boardman, John; Hammond, N. G. L.; Lewis, D. M.; Ostwald, M. (eds.). The Cambridge Ancient History. Vol. 4. Cambridge University Press. pp. 1–52. doi:10.1017/CHOL9780521228046.002. ISBN 9781139054317.
- Young, T. Cuyler (1997). "Medes". In Meyers, Eric M. (ed.). The Oxford encyclopedia of archaeology in the Near East. Vol. 3. Oxford University Press. pp. 448–450. ISBN 978-0-19-511217-7.
- Zadok, Ran (2002). "The Ethno-Linguistic Character of Northwestern Iran and Kurdistan in the Neo-Assyrian Period". Iran. 40: 89–151. doi:10.2307/4300620. ISSN 0578-6967. JSTOR 4300620.
- Schmitt, Rüdiger (2008). "Old Persian". In Woodard, Roger D. (ed.). The Ancient Languages of Asia and the Americas. Cambridge University Press. pp. 76–100. ISBN 978-0-521-68494-1.
- Stronach, David (1968). "Tepe Nush-i Jan: A Mound in Media". The Metropolitan Museum of Art Bulletin. New Series. 27 (3): 177–186. doi:10.2307/3258384. ISSN 0026-1521. JSTOR 3258384.
- Stronach, David (1982). "Archeology ii. Median and Achaemenid". In Yarshater, E. (ed.). Encyclopædia Iranica. Vol. 2. Routledge & Kegan Paul. pp. 288–96. ISBN 978-0-933273-67-2.
- Lanfranchi, Giovanni B.; Roaf, Michael; Rollinger, Robert (2003). Continuity of Empire (?) Assyria, Media, Persia. Padoue: S.a.r.g.o.n. Editrice e Libreria. CON.
- Windfuhr, Gernot L. (1991). "Central dialects". In Yarshater, E. (ed.). Encyclopædia Iranica. Routledge & Kegan Paul. pp. 242–51. ISBN 978-0-939214-79-2.
- B. Kienast (1999). "The So-Called 'Median Empire'". Bulletin of the Canadian Society for Mesopotamian Studies. 34: 59–67.
