= Saparda =

State within Median kingdom and site of resistance to Assyrian military

Saparda (or Sparda), was one district of the Assyrian province Harhar and an area in the Median kingdom. It was positioned at the western border of Media near Ellipi.

At the time of the Medes and Assyrians, the former were dominated by the latter. About 670 BC, Dusanni, king of Saparda, joined the rebellion led by Kashtariti, king of the Medes, against Assyria.
