= Tritantaechmes =

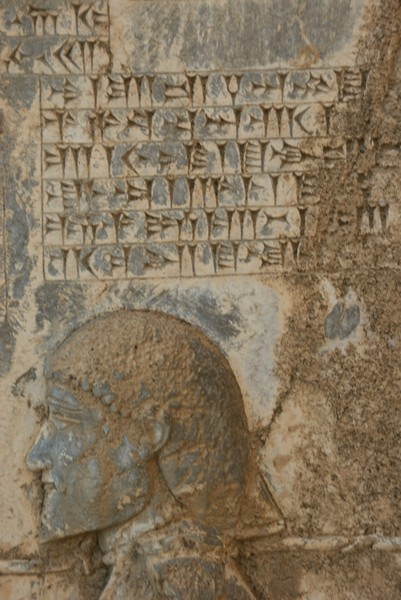
Behistun relief of Tritantaechmes. Label "This is Tritantaechmes. He lied, saying "I am king of Sagartia, from the family of Cyaxares.""

Tritantaechmes (Old Persian: 𐎨𐎡𐏂𐎫𐎧𐎶, romanized: Ciçantakhma, Elamite: Ṣi-iš-šá-an-tak-ma, Babylonian: Ši-it-ra-an-taḫ-ma) was a king of the Sagartians, who ruled in Arbela (521 BCE). He claimed to be a descendant of the king Cyaxares of Media.

In the summer of 521 BCE, Tritantaechmes, was defeated and captured by Takhmaspada, a general serving under Darius I of Persia. Following his capture, Darius imposed severe punishments on Tritantaechmes, including the mutilation of his nose and ears, blinding him, and ultimately ordering his crucifixion in Arbela. Notably, Darius's historical accounts omit any mention of the customary punishment of tongue removal, typically reserved for those deemed liars. This omission has led historians to speculate that Tritantaechmes may have had ties to the Median royal lineage.

== See also ==
- Skunkha
