= Kishsassu =

City in ancient Assyria

Kishsassu or Kishassu (Akkadian: Kiššaššu) was a city in ancient Assyria. It is mentioned in tablets found in Nineveh dating from the 7th century BCE.

The city was invaded by the Median chieftain Kashtariti.

Some scholars suggest Kishsassu was the city of Kishisim (or Kishisu). Sargon II subdued this town, calling it Kar-Nergal or Kar-Ninib.

Gaston Maspero believes the city was located in the Gavê-Rud basin, while Adolf Billerbeck identifies Kishsassu as the ruins of Siama in the "upper valley of Lesser Zab".
