= Sagartians =

Ancient Iranian people

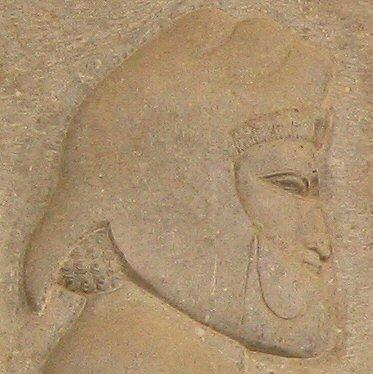
A Sagartian, Apadana, Persepolis.

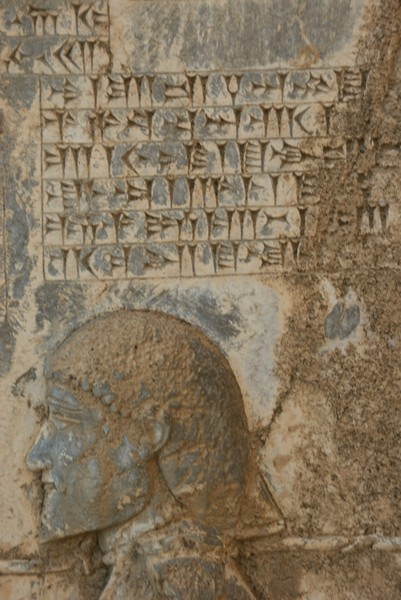
Behistun relief of Tritantaechmes. Label "This is Tritantaechmes. He lied, saying 'I am king of Sagartia, from the family of Cyaxares.'"

The Sagartians (Latin: Sagartii; Ancient Greek: Σαγάρτιοι Sagártioi; Old Persian: 𐎠𐎿𐎥𐎼𐎫𐎡𐎹 Asagartiya "Sagartian"; Elamite: 𒀾𒐼𒋼𒀀𒋾𒅀 Aš-šá-kar-ti-ia, Babylonian: 𒆳𒊓𒂵𒅈𒋫𒀀𒀀 ^{KUR}Sa-ga-ar-ta-a-a) were an ancient Iranian tribe, dwelling in the Iranian plateau. Their exact location is unknown; they were probably neighbors of the Parthians in northeastern Iran. According to Herodotus (1.125, 7.85), they were related to the Persians (Southwestern Iranian), but they may also have entered a political union with the Medians (Northwestern Iranian) at some point (J. van Wesendonk in ZII 9, 1933, pp. 23f.). Ptolemy (6.2.6) locates them in Media, while Stephanus of Byzantium claims that there was a peninsula in the Caspian Sea called Sagartía. They were nomadic pastoralists, their main weapon being the lasso (Herodotus 7.85).

It is unclear whether they are identical to the Zikirti mentioned by Sargon II as inhabitants of northern Zagros in the late 8th century BC. They may have been granted the district of Arbela by Median king Cyaxares as a reward for their aid in the capture of Niniveh.

According to Herodotus (3.93), the Sagartians belonged to the 14th taxation Province of the Achaemenid Empire. A Sagartian delegation appears among the tribute bearers on the Apadana relief. Herodotus also mentioned in the seventh book of his histories that the Sagartians provided 8,000 horsemen for King Xerxes' massive army during the Persian king's invasion of Greece in 480 BC.

== Sources ==
- Choksy, Jamsheed K. (2020). "Yazd: a "Good and Noble City" and an "Abode of Worship"". In Durand-Guédy, David; Mottahedeh, Roy; Paul, Jürgen (eds.). Cities of Medieval Iran. Brill. pp. 217–252. ISBN 978-90-04-43433-2.
- Potts, Daniel T. (2014). Nomadism in Iran: From Antiquity to the Modern Era. London and New York: Oxford University Press. pp. 1–558. ISBN 9780199330799.
