= Kaštaritu =

7th century BCE chieftain of Medes

Kaštaritu (Neo-Assyrian Akkadian: 𒁹𒁉𒋫𒊑𒌅, romanized: Kaštaritu; Old Persian: 𐎧𐏁𐎰𐎼𐎡𐎫, romanized: Xšaθrita; fl. 670s BCE) was a Median chieftain. He is mentioned as "King of the Medes" in an inscription dated 678 BCE. His lands were presumably located along the northeastern border of Assyria. Amongst his possessions was the city of Kār-Kaššî. Kaštariti forged an alliance of the Medes with the Cimmerians, Mannaeans, and Scythians against Assyria.

== Identification ==
It has been suggested that Kaštaritu can be identified as the Median king Phraortes. Some scholars, however, deny such a connection based on historical evidence and linguistic differences in the native Iranian names of the two rulers.

== Reign ==
Assyrian texts mention Kaštaritu's incursions into Assyria, then under the leadership of Esarhaddon. Oracles were commonly sought by Assyrian rulers for such occasions, invoking the gods to assess the situation and guide them towards help. Esarhaddon was no stranger to such practice, frequently turning to these oracles for advice. Before decisions could be made by these oracles, animals would be sacrificed, and omens would then be interpreted based on the positions of the carcasses. Decisions would then be made based on these omens. In this instance, Esarhaddon turned to a priest of the sun god, Shamash, for guidance. Tablets dating from the 7th-century BCE, mostly found in Nineveh, describe multiple "oracle requests" in relation to Kaštaritu in particular. Among the questions raised to Shamash during these oracle requests were whether Kaštaritu was a threat to the Assyrians and whether he would conquer several Assyrian cities. Kaštaritu had asked another Median chieftain, Mamitiarshu, for assistance in attacking the Assyrian city of Kishsassu. One recorded oracle request purports that Esarhaddon feared the loss of the city to the Medians. Kaštaritu also planned a raid on the Assyrian town of Kilmân with the Mannaeans and Saparda.

Kaštaritu's incursions were not a sole occurrence, as Esarhaddon had constantly sought oracles to help deal with his bothersome campaign into Assyrian territories. One oracle request suggests that Kaštaritu attempted to make peace with the Assyrians. He sent a messenger to the Assyrian royal court in the hopes of creating a treaty. Esarhaddon pleaded to Shamash, asking whether he should agree to the peace or interrogate the messenger and kill him. A subsequent oracle request suggests that peace was never achieved. Instead, the Assyrians possibly mounted a retaliation against Kaštaritu and his forces, with the intention of finally ending attacks from Kaštaritu. Kaštaritu's alliance was divided due to internal disagreements, and Kaštaritu's campaign in Assyria ended before 673 BCE. Some Scythian tribes continued attacks into Assyria. Other Scythian tribes, under the leadership of Bartatua, sought to marry Esarhaddon's daughter to create an alliance with Esarhaddon as a means to end the hostilities. Other Median tribes in Kaštaritu's alliance also settled peace with the Assyrians.

== Sources ==
- Howorth, Henry H. (16 April 1892), "The Beginnings of Persian History", The Academy, vol. XLI, London
- Maspero, Gaston (1900), Sayce, Archibald Henry (ed.), The Passing of the Empires: 850 B.C. to 330 B.C., London: Society for Promoting Christian Knowledge
- Dandamayev, M., Kashtariti, Encyclopædia Iranica
- Jastrow, Morris (1898), The Religion of Babylonia and Assyria, Handbooks on the history of religions; v. 2, Boston: Ginn & Co., hdl:2027/mdp.39015008683719, ISBN 9780790511658
- Kuhrt, Amélie (2007), The Persian Empire: A Corpus of Sources from the Achaemenid Period, Abingdon-on-Thames, UK: Routledge, ISBN 9781136016943
- Goodspeed, George Stephen (1902), A History of the Babylonians and Assyrians, New York: C. Scribner's Sons

Regnal titles
Preceded by unknown	Lord of Kār-Kaššî fl. 670s BCE	Succeeded by Deioces as King of Medes
