= Ellipi =

Ancient kingdom in the western Zagros, related to the Elamites

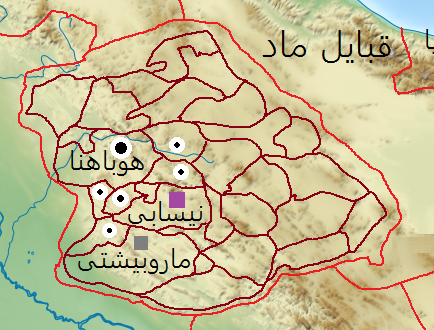
Map of 5 Ellipi Provinces

Ellipi was an ancient kingdom located on the western side of the Zagros (modern Iran), between Babylonia at the west, Media at the north east, Mannae at the north and Elam at the south. The inhabitants of Ellipi were close relatives of the Elamites.

== History ==
The period of major development in Ellipi was from the 9th to 7th centuries BC, as is reflected in archaeological research. The prosperity of the country came from the control of trade routes. They were also cattle dealers. It functioned as a buffer state between Assyrian provinces of Kishesim (Kar-Nergal) and Harhar (Kar-Sharrukin) and Elam.

== Assyrian Vassal ==
During the 8th and 7th centuries BC it was ruled by an Iranicized dynasty.

=== Talta of Ellipi (d. 707 BC) ===
Talta (Dalta) was the King of Ellipi. He was probably on the throne contemporary with Assyrian kings Tiglath-Pileser III (r. 745-727 BC) and Shalmaneser V (r. 727-722 BC). He paid tribute to the Assyrian king Sargon II (r. 722-705 BC) since 714 BC.

=== War of Succession (Civil War) ===
In 707 BC, when Talta died of old age, his (sister's?) sons Nibe, supported by Elam, and Ishparaba, supported by Sargon II, started a civil war with Ishparaba winning and becoming king of Ellipi.

=== Ishparaba of Ellipi ===
In 703 BC, Ellipi was implicated in the Babylonian rebellions of Marduk-apal-iddina II against Assyria. In 702 BC, he was strongly punished by king Sennacherib of Assyria, who took Marubishti, the capital city.

The Sennacherib Prism Column 2 states: "The front of my yoke I turned around and took the road to the land of the Elippi. Before me Ispabâra, their king, abandoned his strong cities, his treasurehouses, and fled to the distant parts. Over the whole of his wide land I swept like a hurricane. The cities Marubishti and Akkuddu, his royal residence-cities, together with 34 small towns of their area, I besieged, I captured, I destroyed, I devastated, I burned with fire. The people, great and small, male and female, horses, mules, asses, camels, cattle, and sheep, without number I carried off. I brought him to nothing; I diminished his land."

=== Fall ===
During the 7th century BC, Ellipi suffered Cimmerian invasions, and then disappeared from sources.

== Literature ==
- Lendering, J.: "Cimmerians ", www.livius.org
- Liverani, M. (1995)): El Antiguo Oriente: Historia, Sociedad y economía.
- Quintana, E. (1997): Historia de Elam, el vecino mesopotámico.
- Rogers, R. W. (1900): A History of Babylonia and Assyria (Volume II)
- Luckenbill, Daniel David (1924) The Annals of Sennacherib. Oriental Institute Publications 2. Chicago: Univ. of Chicago
- Josette Elayi (2017) Sargon II, King of Assyria
