= Kār-Kaššî =

City in ancient Media

Kār-Kaššî was first mentioned as Karkasia, a Median settlement paying tribute to Assyrian king Shalmaneser II (1030–1019 BCE). Kār-Kaššî was later mentioned in tablets found in Nineveh, dating from the 7th-century BCE. During the 670s BCE, it was in the possession of Median chieftain, Kaštaritu.

In an article for the Journal asiatique in 1880, Joseph Halévy proposed that Kār-Kaššî was located in Karkathiokertha (Karkasiokertha) in Armenia. However, he later withdrew his interpretation. It is now generally believed that Kār-Kaššî was located in Media, within the Central Zagros Mountains (present-day Iran). Kār-Kaššî may have been presumably located near modern-day Karkasheh.
