= Mario Liverani =

Italian historian and professor

Mario Liverani (born 10 January 1939 in Rome), is an Italian historian and Professor of Ancient Near East History at the University of Rome La Sapienza. He is a member of many institutions, such as the American Oriental Society, Accademia delle Scienze di Torino, and doctor Honoris Causa of the University of Copenhagen and the Autonomous University of Madrid.

== Awards and honors ==
- 2014 Sheikh Zayed Book Award in the "Arabic Culture in Other Languages" category for his book "Imagining Babylon"

== Selected works ==
- International Relations in the Ancient Near East, 1600-1100 BC. Studies in Diplomacy. New York: Palgrave, 2001.
- Myth and Politics in Ancient Near Eastern Historiography. Written in co-operation with Zainab Bahrani. Studies in Egyptology and the Ancient Near East. London: Equinox, 2004.
- Israel's History And the History of Israel. Translated by Chiara Peri and Philip R. Davies. Bible World. London: Equinox, 2005. (original italian edition Oltre la Bibbia: Storia Antica di Israele. Roma-Bari: Laterza, 2003).
- Antico Oriente: Storia, Società, Economia. Biblioteca Storica Laterza. Rome: Laterza, 2011.
- Liverani, Mario (2006). Uruk: The First City. Translated by Bahrani, Zainab; Van De Mieroop, Marc. London: Equinox. ISBN 978-1-84553-191-1. (original italian edition Uruk: La Prima Città. Roma-Bari: Laterza, 1998).
- Liverani, Mario (2014). The Ancient Near East: History, Society and Economy. London: Routledge. ISBN 978-0415679060.
- Imagining Babylon: The Modern Story of an Ancient City (Studies in Ancient Near Eastern Records (SANER) Book 11), ISBN 978-1614516026 (original italian edition Immaginare Babele: Due secoli di studi sulla città orientale antica. Roma-Bari: Laterza, 2013)

== Selected publications and contributions ==
- "Karkemiš nei testi di Ugarit". Rivista degli Studi Orientali. 35: 135–146. 1960.
- "Bar-Guš e Bar-Rakib". Rivista degli Studi Orientali. 36: 185–187. 1961.
- "Antecedenti dell'onomastica aramaica antica". Rivista degli studi orientali. 32 (1/2): 65–76. 1962.
- ""Antecedenti del diptotismo arabo nei testi accadici di Ugarit". Rivista degli Studi Orientali. 38: 131–160. 1963.
- "Memorandum on the Approach to Historiographic Texts". Orientalia. Nova Series. 42: 178–194. 1973.
- "A Seasonal Pattern for the Amarna Letters". Lingering over Words: Studies in Ancient Near Eastern Literature in Honor of William L. Moran. Leiden: Brill. 1990. pp. 337–348.
- "Recenti ricerche sull'agricoltura sumerica". Studi Storici. 32 (1): 221–226. 1991.
- "The Medes at Esarhaddon's Court". Journal of Cuneiform Studies. 47: 57–62. 1995. doi:10.2307/1359815. JSTOR 1359815. S2CID 163290816.
- "L'immagine dei fenici nella storiografia occidentale". Studi Storici. 39 (1): 5–22. 1998.
- "Nuovi sviluppi nello studio della storia dell'Israele biblico". Biblica. 80 (4): 488–505. 1999.
- "I garamanti: Ricerche in corso e nuove prospettive". Studi Storici. 42 (3): 769–783. 2001.
- "Guerra santa e guerra giusta nel Vicino Oriente antico (Circa 1600-600 a.C.)". Studi Storici. 43 (3): 639–659. 2002.
- "Historical Overview". A Companion to the Ancient Near East. Wiley-Blackwell. 2005. pp. 1–19.
- "The King in the Palace". Orientalia. 78 (1): 81–91. 2009.
- ""UNTRUTHFUL STELES": PROPAGANDA AND RELIABILITY IN ANCIENT MESOPOTAMIA". Opening the Tablet Box. Near Eastern Studies in Honor of Benjamin R. Foster. Leiden: Brill. 2010. pp. 229–244.
- "The Book Of Kings And Ancient Near Eastern Historiography". The Books of Kings. Sources, Composition, Historiography and Reception. Leiden: Brill. 2010. pp. 161–184.
- "Late Mesopotamia". The Oxford History of Historical Writing: Volume 1: Beginnings to AD 600. Oxford: Oxford University Press. 2011. pp. 29–52.
- ""I CONSTRUCTED PALACES THROUGHOUT MY COUNTRY" ESTABLISHING THE ASSYRIAN PROVINCIAL ORDER: THE MOTIF AND ITS VARIANTS". Revue d'Assyriologie et d'archéologie orientale. 106: 181–191. 2012.
- "Literary-Political Motifs in the Assyrian Royal Inscriptions". Literature as Politics, Politics as Literature: Essays on the Ancient Near East in Honor of Peter Machinist. Eisenbrauns. 2013. pp. 269–284.
