= Deioces =

King of the Medes from 727 to 674 BCE

- King of Media
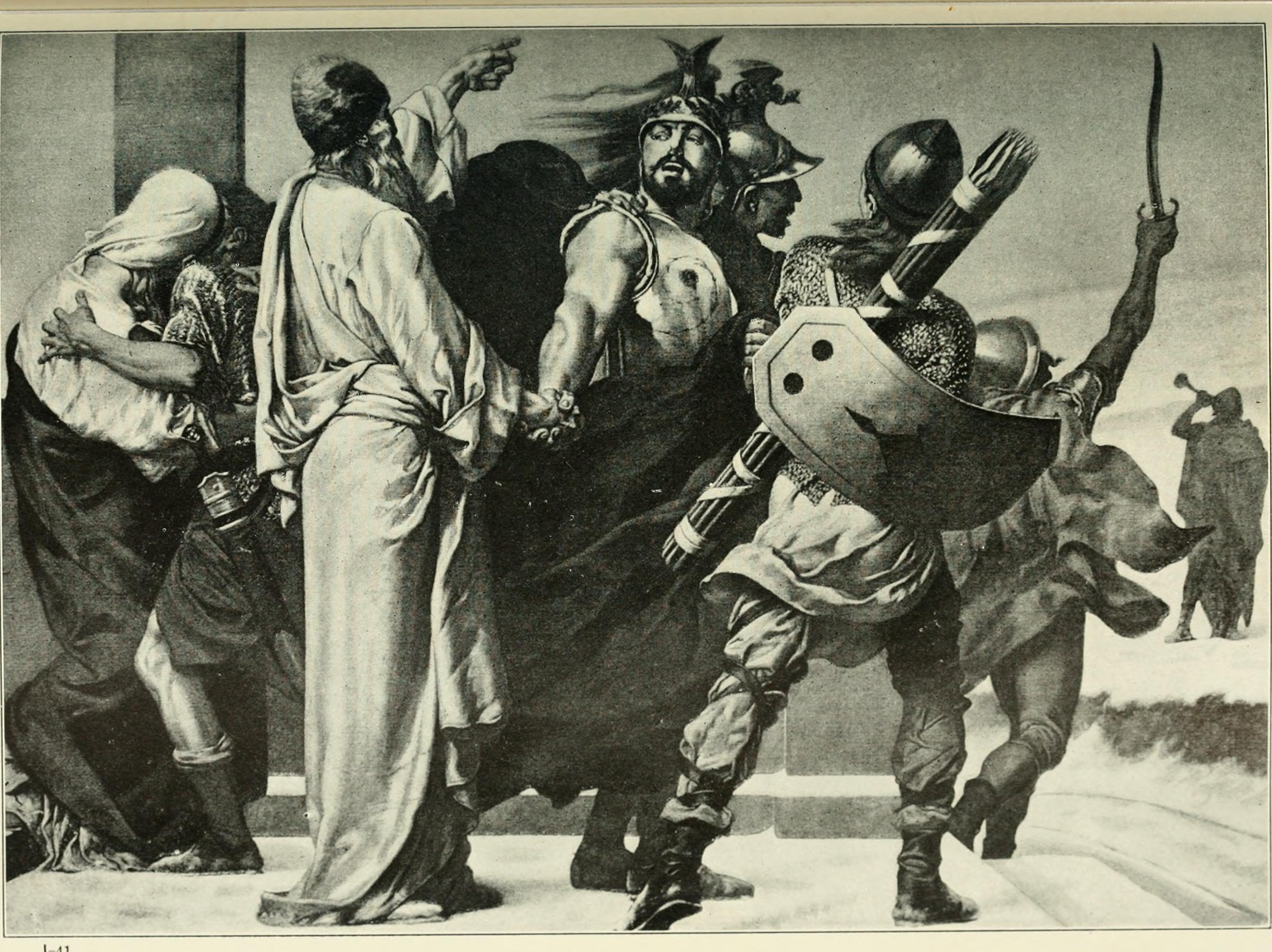
- Deioces commands the Medes to set forth on their course of conquest. After a painting by Louis Boulanger (1806–1867).

King of the Medes
- Reign: 53 regnal years c. 727–674 BC
- Predecessor: Kingdom established
- Successor: Phraortes
- Died: 674 BC
- Dynasty: Median
- Father: Phraortes, the Old
- Religion: Ancient Iranian religion

Deioces (Note: /ˈdiəˌsiz/ DEE-ə-seez; Ancient Greek: Δηιόκης) was the founder and the first king of the Median Kingdom, an ancient polity located in the Iranian plateau. His name has been mentioned in different forms in various sources, including the ancient Greek historian Herodotus.

The exact date of the era of Deioces' rule is not clear and probably covered most of the first half of the 7th century BC. According to Herodotus, Deioces was the first Median king to have gained independence from the Neo-Assyrian Empire and governed for 53 years. After Deioces' death, his son, Phraortes, succeeded him.

== Etymology ==
Deioces' name has been mentioned in various forms in different sources. The Greek historian Herodotus has stated his name as Δηϊόκης (Dēiokēs). In Assyrian texts, he has been mentioned as Da-a-a-uk-ku; and in Elamite ones, as Da-a-(hi-)(ú-)uk-ka and Da-a-ya-u(k)-ka.

Deioces' name is derived from the Iranian Dahyu-ka, and is the junior noun of the word dahyu-, meaning "the land". The old Iranian name Deioces was not uncommon even in later times. In the Achaemenid period, the Old Persian form of Deioces has been mentioned in several Elamite inscriptions of the mud plates of Persepolis. Those mentions apparently referred to different persons in separate government regions, and one of them was an individual assigned to the food rationing of the horses.

Friedrich von Spiegel believes that Dahayuku means "resident and headman of the village" and is in fact the older form of the word dehghan "farmer". Also following Spiegel's theory, Ferdinand Justi believes that Deioces' name is his title and a shortened form of dahyaupati in Old Persian and danhupaiti in Avestan, having acquired the suffix -ka. The name of Deioces may also be related to the modern Kurdish name Diyako.

== Dating ==
The era of Deioces' reign is subject to controversy. Herodotus says that Deioces ruled for 53 years, and thus some assumptions have been made about the era of his reign; but it seems that Herodotus's report is based on a verbal narrative. Based on Herodotus's report, the researchers have concluded that Deioces was the founder of the Median kingdom and also the first Median king, having gained independence from the Assyrians. But Herodotus's report is a mixture of Greek and Oriental legends and is not historically reliable. Also, it is assumed that the Median king whom Herodotus's reports are about is the same Deioces, Phraortes' father; thus, it is not possible to clarify the exact date of the period of his rule; but it can be said that it probably covered most of the first half of the 7th century BC. Igor Diakonoff says: "The state of the era of Deioces' reign in Herodotus's writings is so different from the picture of that time (745-675 BC) described by the Assyrian sources that some historians have rejected Herodotus's statement."

In Assyrian sources, 674 BC, there are mentions of the actions of a person called Kashthrita, whom some researchers believe to be the same Phraortes. Therefore, the year 674 BC can be considered the end of Deioces' rule; and by reckoning his fifty-three-year old reign, the beginning of the era of Deioces' rule should be around 728 BC. Below is a list of the era of Deioces' reign based on the historians' views:

Historian	Herodotus	George Cameron	Edvin Grantovsky	Igor Diakonoff
Era	700-647 BC	728-675 BC	672-640 BC	700-678 BC

== History ==
=== Historicity ===
Herodotus's Deioces is sometimes associated with a provincial governor (šaknu) named Daiukku, mentioned several times in Neo-Assyrian texts from the time of Sargon II. Daiukku governed somewhat independently a district on the border between the Mannaeans and the Assyrian kingdoms. He allied with the king of Urartu against the Mannaen ruler but was captured by Sargon II, who exiled him and his family to Syria in 715 BC, where he apparently died. However, this association is highly unlikely, as the events mentioned would be located around Lake Urmia and not in Median territory. His namesake might have been one of the many chiefs of free Median districts outside Assyrian control. According to Herodotus, Deioces lived in the late 8th century BC, around the same time as the Median chief Daiku of Saparda. However, the identification would be more justifiable if Daiku were the chief of Hagabta, not Saparda. Hagbata is the only Median settlement mentioned in Assyrian sources whose name is similar to that of Ecbatana, the place chosen by Herodotus's Deioces to become the capital of the Median kingdom.

=== Foundation of the Median kingdom ===
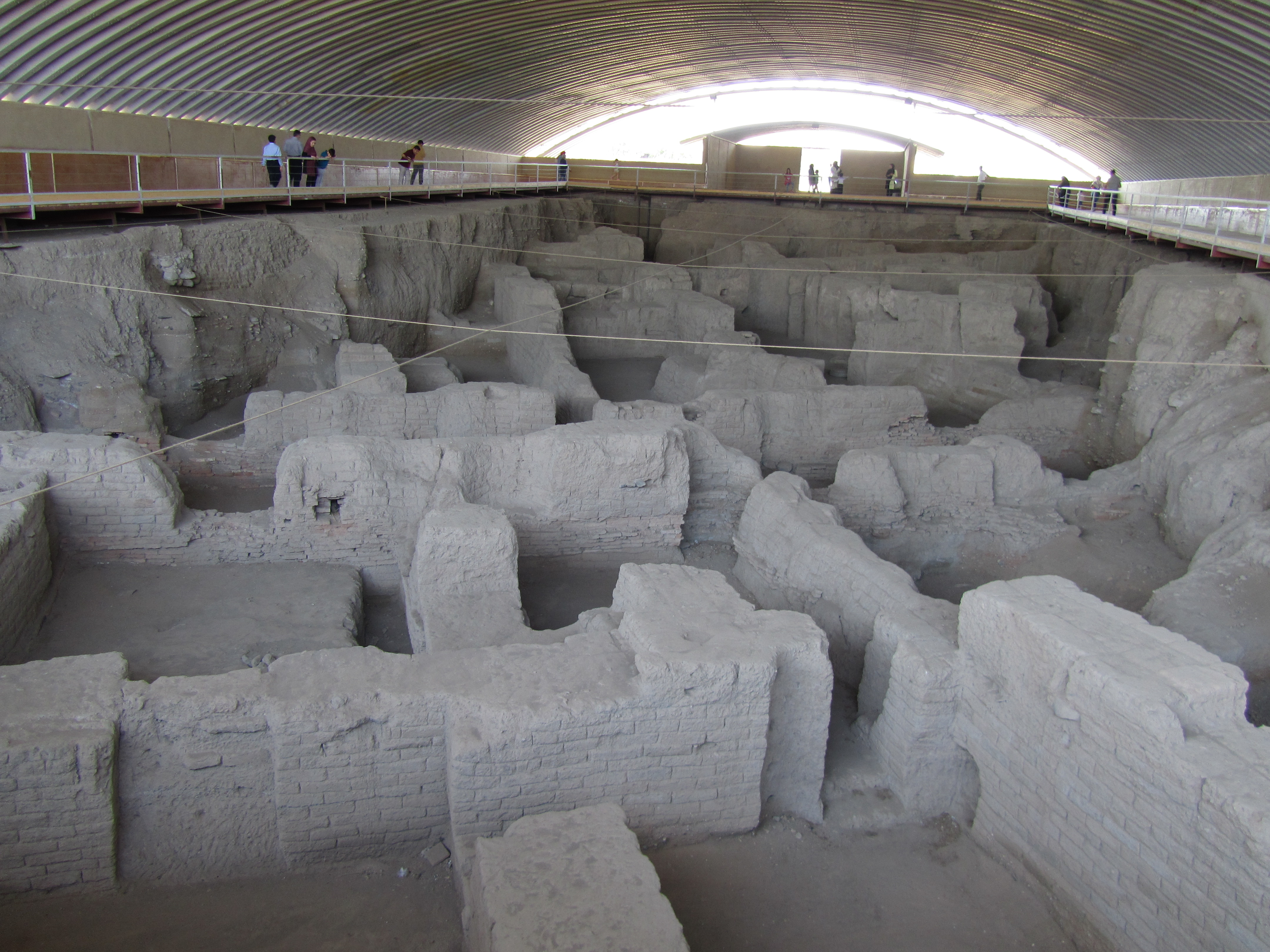
A photo of Ecbatana.

What is known from the Assyrian texts is that from the 9th to 7th century BC, the Medes had not been able to thrive enough to cause the convergence and alliance and organization of the scattered Median tribes and clans around a superior and single leader and lord who could be called the king of all the Median lands. During their several invasions on the Median settled territories, the Assyrian kings always encountered a large number of "local shahs" and not a single king ruling all of the Median lands. After the death of Sargon II in 705 BC, the Assyrians diverted their attention to another spot far from Iran. The opportunity, along with the everlasting fear of the Assyrian invasion, caused the formation of a union of Median princes and monarchs.

According to Herodotus, the Medes were the first people to break free from Assyrian dominance. The Medes were living in small villages with independent rulers, when a certain Deioces embarked on an elaborate scheme to make himself king. In the anarchistic era of the Medes, Deioces tried to enforce justice in his own village and gained a credit and reputation as a neutral judge. Thus, the territory of his activity expanded, and the peoples of other villages resorted to him until he eventually announced that the requests of the people are too much, the post is troublesome and difficult for him, and he is not ready to continue the work. Following the resignation, theft and chaos increased, and the Medes gathered and chose him as the king to settle the disagreements. Deioces thus rose from a commoner to a despot who united the Median tribes. Under his rule, he established a spearmen guard and constructed a new capital, Ecbatana, with strong fortifications and a royal palace.

Deioces held a ceremony for the first time; Herodotus states that Deioces stayed in his palace; and his connection was by sending to and receiving messages from the outside; and no one was able to contact the king directly; and the petitions and messages were performed only by the messengers; the limitation was to make a sense of fear and respect among the people. Besides, it was forbidden to laugh or expectorate in the king's presence. Of his other actions was creating a group called "The King's Eyes and Ears", which consisted of people assigned to spy for the king himself; this organization and group existed during the Achaemenid era.

Diakonoff believes that Deioces could not have been the king of the whole Medes, and was not even the ruler of a large region, and was just one of the small and numerous Median lords; but the illustrious history of the successors shone on his face and gave him fame in history. After Deioces, his son, Phraortes, succeeded him and ruled for 22 years; though some researchers believe that he ruled for fifty-three years (678-625 BC).

=== Ecbatana ===
After his coronation, Deioces' first action was to appoint guards for himself and also construct a capital. The city which Deioces chose for it was called Hagmatāna in Old Persian and Ecbatana in Greek language, believed to be Hamadan today. Ecbatana means "the gathering place" or "a city for everyone" and indicates the gathering of Median clans, which had been disunited before. In the late 8th century BC, he had a fortified castle constructed on a hill in the city to run all the military, government and treasury affairs within.

Herodotus described that the royal complex was made of seven concentric walls, with each internal one higher than the external one. Each of the seven walls was decorated with a specific colour: the first (external) wall was white, the second wall black, the third one high red, the fourth blue, fifth low red, sixth wall copper, and the seventh and innermost wall gold. Such a coloring was the symbol of the seven planets in Babylon, but was an imitation of Babylon in Ecbatana. The king's palace was situated within the last wall along with its treasures.

However, this narrative of Herodotus's is not corroborated by what is written in Assyrian sources, which imply the existence of various masters in the Medes until years after Deioces, and the foundation of an independent royal body and constructing several large royal complexes was not something that the Assyrians could easily remain silent against; thus these words from Herodotus seem exaggerative, or depict an adapted and modified picture of the periods after Deioces' reign. Nevertheless, Polybius, a famous Greek historian, mentioned this palace in his book and his description of Hamadan, stating the long age of this palace.

According to some historians and archaeologists, the hill that is currently situated in the city and known as the Ecbatana Hill, was the true place of the ancient city of Ecbatana.

Some historians, including Henry Rawlinson, believe that the Ecbatana mentioned in Herodotus's writings is not the current Hamadan; and the olden Median capital should be searched in Takht-e Soleymān and in the vicinity of Lake Urmia to the southeast. But some researchers, like Jacques de Morgan, believe that Herodotus's Ecbatana is the same Hamadan today, and the places of the seven castles of Fort Ecbatana could be identified by the projections on the land and hills.

== In narrative Iranian history ==
Some Iranologists believe Deioces to be the Hushang in Shahnameh due to the features Herodotus states for him and consider the title Paradat or Pishdadian equal to "the first legislator". The religious tradition considers Hushang the first person to establish kingship in Iran.

Among Herodotus's reports about Deioces and those of Avesta and Middle Persian, Arabic and New Persian texts about Hushang, there are some common features about the identities of Hushang and Deioces; the most important of them can be summarized in three points:

1. According to Herodotus, Deioces was the headman of the village during the time; and the name or title Deioces meaning farmer must have been given to him because of this; and Hushang, according to Arabic and Persian texts, made innovations in agriculture; and thus he probably acquired the title farmer.
2. Deioces and Hushang were the first legislator and the first king; and thus, Hushang was given the title Paradat or Pishdad or Bishdad and Fishdad (Arabic), which was probably an imitation of the name and title of the Assyrian king Sargon of Akkad, meaning "the lawful king".
3. Deioces and Hushang developed housing and urban lifestyle, and thus Hushang acquired the name or title Heoshingeh or Hushang or Ushhanj (Arabic).

== Notes ==
Deioces Median dynasty
New title	King of Media; 700–678 BC	Succeeded by Phraortes
