= Median dynasty =

Ancient royal dynasty state

Median dynasty 𐎶𐎠𐎭 Māda
- c. 678 BC (Note: The dates that the Greek historian Herodotus attributes to the four Median kings (Deioces, Phraortes, Cyaxares, and Astyages) add up to 150 years, placing the beginning of the Median dynasty in 700 BC. However, Herodotus also states that the Medes ruled Asia for 128 years. Therefore, the start of these 128 years would be in 678 BCE, which, according to the chronology proposed by George Rawlinson, is the year when the reign of Phraortes begins. Phraortes would have overthrown the Assyrian rule in Media and, as Herodotus states, subjugated the Persians and other peoples. As for Deioces, if he existed, he was likely a chief who began consolidating the unity of the Median tribes.)–c. 550 BC
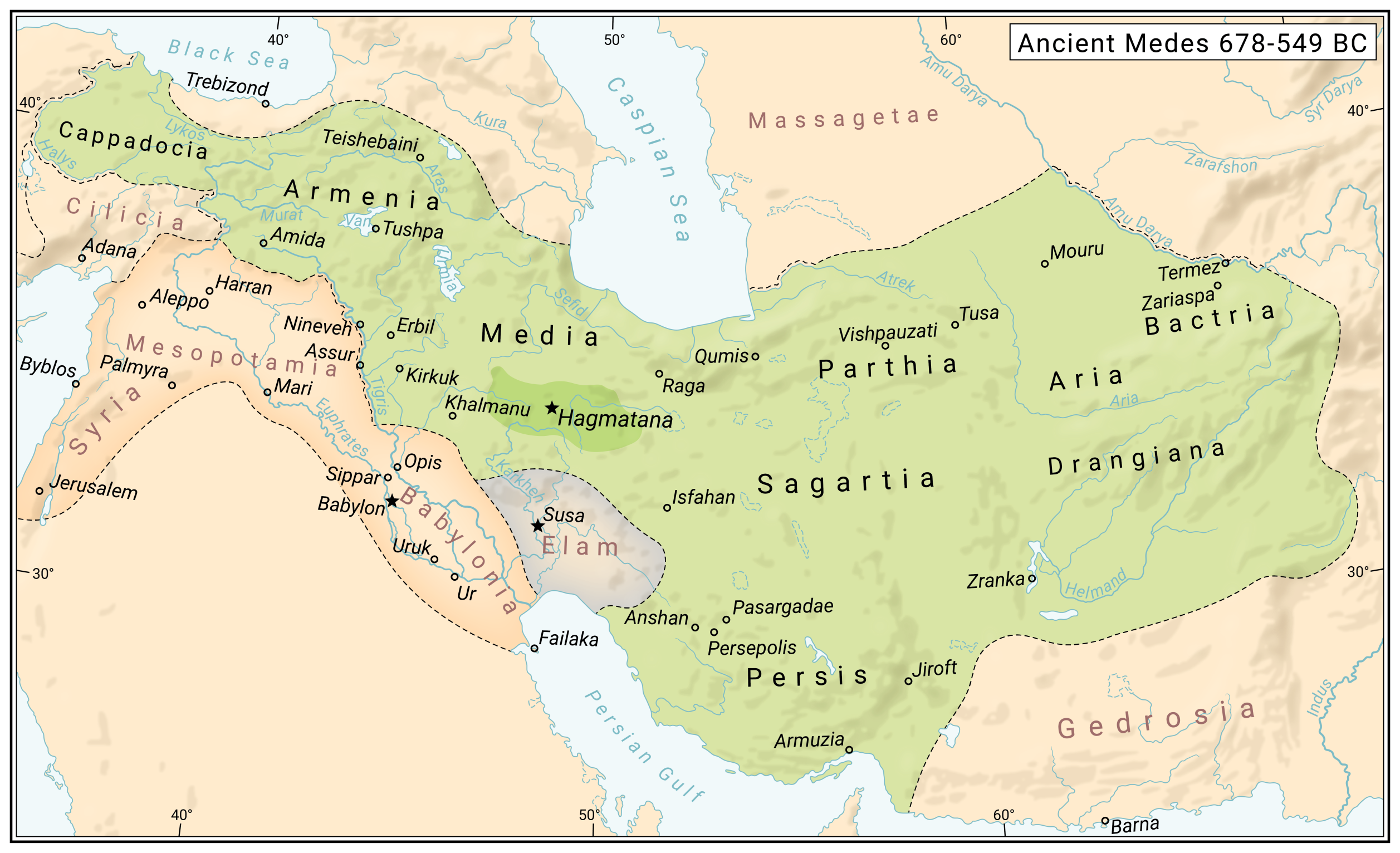
- Hypothetical map of the Median dynasty at its maximum extent
- Capital: Ecbatana
- Common languages: Median
- Religion: Ancient Iranian religion
- Government: Monarchy
- Kings
  - 700–678 BC: Deioces
  - 678–625 BC: Phraortes
  - 625–585 BC: Cyaxares
  - 585–550 BC: Astyages
- Historical era: Iron Age
  - Accession of Phraortes: c. 678 BC (Note: The dates that the Greek historian Herodotus attributes to the four Median kings (Deioces, Phraortes, Cyaxares, and Astyages) add up to 150 years, placing the beginning of the Median dynasty in 700 BC. However, Herodotus also states that the Medes ruled Asia for 128 years. Therefore, the start of these 128 years would be in 678 BCE, which, according to the chronology proposed by George Rawlinson, is the year when the reign of Phraortes begins. Phraortes would have overthrown the Assyrian rule in Media and, as Herodotus states, subjugated the Persians and other peoples. As for Deioces, if he existed, he was likely a chief who began consolidating the unity of the Median tribes.)
  - Median revolt against Assyria: 672 BC
  - Accession of Cyaxares: 625 BC
  - Medes and Babylonians conquer Nineveh: 612 BC
  - Battle of the Eclipse: 585 BC
  - Conquered by Cyrus the Great: c. 550 BC

Area
- 585 BC: 2,800,000 km^{2} (1,100,000 sq mi)
Preceded by	Succeeded by
Neo-Assyrian Empire; Urartu	Achaemenid Empire

Media (Old Persian: 𐎶𐎠𐎭 Māda; Greek: Μηδία Mēdía; Akkadian: Mādāya) was a political entity centered in Ecbatana that existed from the 7th century BC until the mid-6th century BC and is believed to have dominated a significant portion of the Iranian plateau, preceding the powerful Achaemenid Empire. The frequent interference of the Assyrians in the Zagros region led to the process of unifying the Median tribes. By 612 BC, the Medes became strong enough to overthrow the declining Assyrian empire in alliance with the Babylonians. However, contemporary scholarship tends to be skeptical about the existence of a united Median kingdom or state, at least for most of the 7th century BCE. The Median dynasty was, according to the ancient Greek historian Herodotus, a dynasty composed of four kings who ruled for 150 years under the Median Empire. If Herodotus' story is accurate, the Medes were unified by a man named Deioces, the first of the four kings who would rule the Median Empire; a mighty empire that included large parts of Iran and eastern Anatolia. According to classical historiography, Media emerged as one major power of the ancient Near East after the collapse of Assyria. Under Cyaxares (r. 625–585 BC), the kingdom's borders were expanded to the east and west through the subjugation of neighboring peoples, such as the Persians and Armenians. Media's territorial expansion led to the formation of the first Iranian empire, which at its height would have exercised authority over an area of 2.8 million square kilometers, stretching from the eastern banks of the Halys River in Anatolia to Central Asia. In this period, the Median empire was one of the great powers in the ancient Near East alongside Babylon, Lydia, and Egypt. During his reign, Astyages (r. 585–550 BC) worked to strengthen and centralize the Median state, going against the will of tribal nobility, which may have contributed to the kingdom's downfall. In 550 BC, the Median capital, Ecbatana, was conquered by the Persian king Cyrus II, marking the beginning of the Achaemenid empire. While it is generally accepted that the Medes played a significant role in the ancient Near East after the fall of Assyria, historians debate the existence of a Median empire or even a kingdom. Some scholars accept the existence of a powerful and organized empire that would have influenced the political structures of the later Achaemenid empire. Others argue that the Medes formed a loose confederation of tribes rather than a centralized state.

== Chronology ==
Using the chronology proposed by Herodotus, a putative timeline of the reign of Median kings can be constructed. (Note that Scythian rule has no specified dates in this chronology.)

Ruler	Reign	Length of reign
Deioces	700–647 BC	53
Phraortes	647–625 BC	22
Madyes (Scythian rule)	?	
Cyaxares	625–585 BC	40
Astyages	585–550 BC	35

Herodotus' numbers are suspect: the first two kings together ruled 75 years, as did the last two, making the total reign of the dynasty 150 years.

The existence of Cyaxares and Astyages is not controversial, as they are mentioned in other contemporaneous sources. However, Deioces and Phraortes, the first two kings, are not mentioned in contemporary sources. Scholars have tried to identify them with other named individuals from the same region and era. In Neo-Assyrian texts from the time of Sargon II, there are several mentions of a Mannean chieftain named Daiaukku, who may be identified with Deioces. These same texts mention that Daiaukku, as the governor of the province of Mannea, joined the king of Urartu against the Mannean ruler. He was captured by Sargon and, in 715 BC, exiled along with his family to Syria, the apparent location of his eventual death.

Based on Herodotus' assertion that Scythian rule over the Medes lasted about 28 years, scholars advanced the start of the Median chronology to the year 728 BC. This allowed them to identify Phraortes, the second Median king, with Kashtariti, the leader of the Median revolt against Assyria in 672 BC. This identification is based on the Behistun Inscription statement of a fear called Fravartis (or Phraortes in the Greek transcription), who revolted against the Persian king Darius the Great in 522 BC, claiming to be XšaØrita "of the family of Cyaxares". If the beginning of Deioces' reign is moved to 728 BC, the absolute chronology of the dynasty can be presented as follows:

Ruler	Reign	Length of reign
Deioces	728–675 BC	53
Phraortes/Kashtariti	675–653 BC	22
Madyes (Scythian rule)	653–625 BC	28
Cyaxares	625–585 BC	40
Astyages	585–550 BC	35

However, this chronology was rejected by scholars when Rene Labat demonstrated that, in various manuscripts of Herodotus' Histories, the 28 years of Scythian rule had in fact been counted as part of the reign of Cyaxares, making it impossible for Phraortes to have been the Kashtariti from Assyrian sources. Edwin Grantovski argued that cuneiform sources could help solve this chronological problem, since they date the Median revolt against Assyria to 672 BC, and the end of the Median dynasty to 550 BC. He offered a chronology in which Scythian rule overlaps with the rule of Phraortes:

Ruler	Reign	Length of reign
Deioces	672–640 BC	32
Phraortes	640–620 BC	20
Madyes (Scythian rule)	635–615 BC	20
Cyaxares	620–584 BC	36
Astyages	584–550 BC	34

Thus, according to Grantovski, the Median dynasty existed for a total of about 120 years. Deioces ended Assyrian rule and founded the Median dynasty. Phraortes subjugated the Persians. Cyaxares began to conquer Upper Asia when the Assyrians were defeated in 612 BC, and their empire lasted until 550 BC. As for Scythian domination over the Medes and other countries, Herodotus' declaration has a legendary and unreliable character, as it cannot be reconciled with the real history of Medes in the 7th century BC, and with the history of all the rest of the ancient Near East.

Another account, also by Herodotus, states that Medes ruled northern Asia for 128 years. If this number is correct, then the beginning of the Median dynasty should be dated to the year 678 BC, which was a few years before the revolt against the Assyrians. It is possible to reconcile the seeming contradiction of Herodotus' data. Herodotus attributes 53 years of reign to Deioces, and 22 years to Phraortes. George Rawlinson proposed, instead, that Phraortes ruled for 53 years, and Deioces for 22 years. With this change, Phraortes' reign can be dated to between 678 and 625 BC. This way, according to Rawlinson, the sum of the reigns of the three kings (53+40+35) after Deioces would then be the 128 years that Herodotus mentioned. In this account, Phraortes was the one who ended Assyrian rule and, as Herodotus claims, attacked the Persian tribes and began to subjugate many other peoples in Asia. Therefore, the starting point of the 128-year period of Median supremacy is likely to have been the accession of Kashtariti/Phraortes, who began ruling a few years before the successful revolt against the Neo-Assyrian Empire, and reigned for 53 years. In this account, Deioces, Phraortes' father, was likely a tribal leader who began to consolidate power among the other Median tribes. It is possible that he was just the eponymous founder of the Median royal house. According to Diakonoff, Herodotus may have oversimplified the chronology, and transferred to Deioces the activities of several generations of Median chiefs, thus attributing to him the founding of the fear realm. Cyaxares, in coalition with Babylonia, conquered the Neo-Assyrian Empire and established Median rule over the parts of Asia that are east of the river Halys. Under this hypothesis, the chronology of the Median kings can be presented as follows:

Ruler	Reign	Length of reign
Deioces	700–678 BC	22
Phraortes	678–625 BC	53
Madyes (Scythian rule)	?	
Cyaxares	625–585 BC	40
Astyages	585–550 BC	35

=== Median rulers according to Ctesias ===
Reign	Name(s)
28 years	Arbaces
50 years	Maudaces
30 years	Sosarmus
50 years	Artycas
22 years	Arbianes
40 years	Artaeus
22 years	Artynes
40 years	Artibaras
	Aspadas (Apandas)/Astyages (Astyigas)

== Genealogy ==
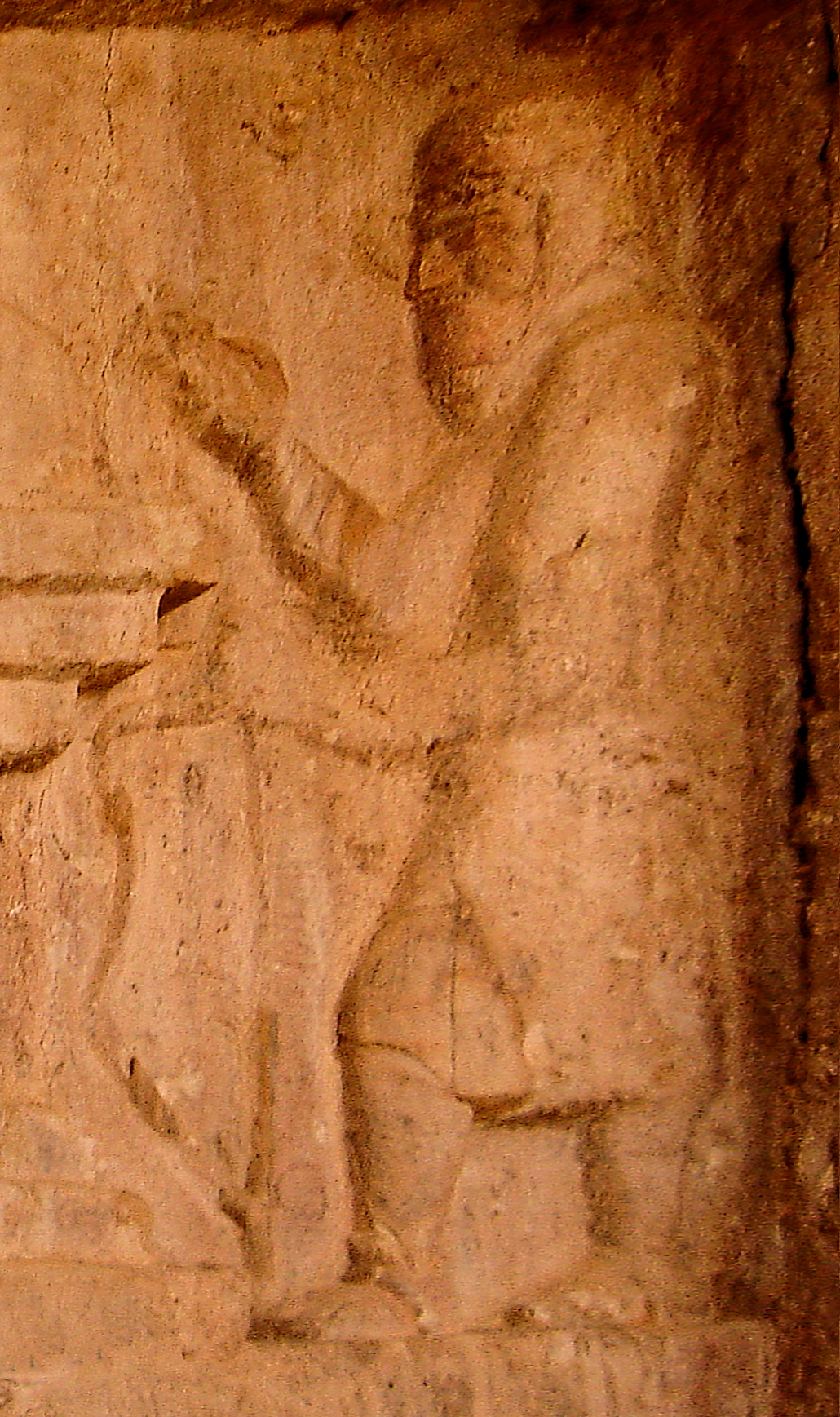
A relief that perhaps represents Cyaxares, the most important Median king

Family tree of the Median dynasty and its kinship with the Babylonians, Lydians and Persians, according to records of historians Herodotus, Berossus and Ctesias. According to Berossus, Nebuchadnezzar married Amytis, daughter of Astyages. It is impossible for Amytis to be the daughter of Astyages, for he was still too young during Nabopolassar's reign to have children, and not yet king; it seems more likely that Amytis was the daughter of Cyaxares and therefore the sister of Astyages. Astyages would have married Aryenis, but it is uncertain whether he was the father of any sons or daughters. Herodotus and Xenophon claim that he had a daughter named Mandane, who would have married Cambyses I and would have been the mother of Cyrus the Great. Ctesias denied the veracity of this statement and stated that Astyages had a daughter named Amytis, who married Spitamas and after his death she would have married Cyrus the Great.

Consanguineous relatives of Deioces

Phraortes
Deioces r. 700–678 BC
Mermandae dynasty	Phraortes r. 675–653 BC
Alyattes r. 591–560 BC	Cyaxares r. 625–585 BC	Chaldean dynasty
Croesus r. 560–546 BC	Aryenis	Astyages r. 585–550 BC	Amytis	Nebuchadnezzar II r. 605–562 BC
Amel-Marduk r. 562–560 BC
Achaemenid dynasty
Mandane	Cambyses I r. 580–559 BC
Spitamas	Amytis	Cyrus II r. 559–530 BC
Spitaces	Megabernes

== Bibliography ==
- Dandamaev, M. A. (1989). A Political History of the Achaemenid Empire. BRILL. ISBN 978-90-04-09172-6.
- Dandamayev, M.; Medvedskaya, I. (2006). "Media". Encyclopaedia Iranica.
- Labat, René (1961). "Kaštariti, Phraorte et les débuts de l'histoire Mède". Journal Asiatique (249): 1–12.
- Lendering, Jona (1995). "Cyaxares". Livius.
