= Medes =

Ancient Iranian people

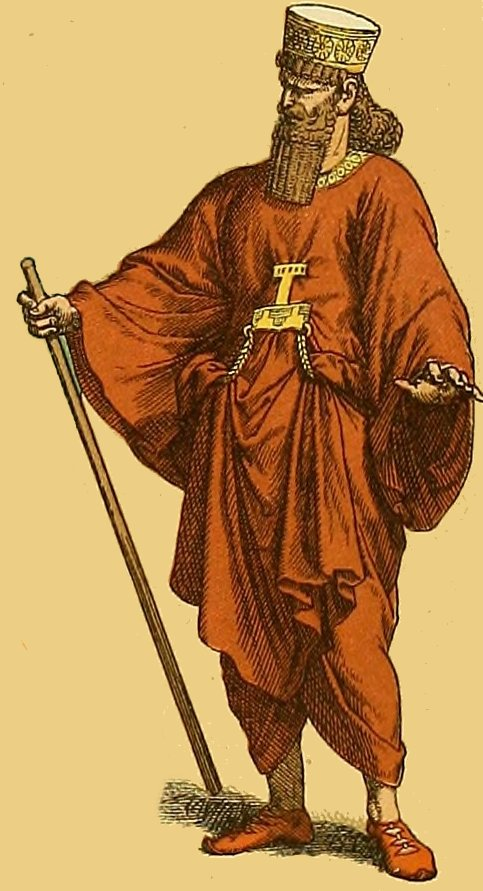
Artistic representation of a Median man

The Medes (Note: /miːdz/; Old Persian: 𐎶𐎠𐎭, romanized: Māda; Neo-Assyrian Akkadian: 𒆳𒈠𒁕𒀀𒀀, romanized: Mādāya; Ancient Greek: Μῆδοι, romanized: Mêdoi; Biblical Hebrew: מָדַי, romanized: Madáy According to the OED entry "Mede", the word is from Classical Latin Mēdus (usually as plural, Mēdī) from ancient Greek (Attic and Ionic) Μῆδος, Mê̄dos, [mɛ̂ːdos] (Cypriot: Μᾶδοι, Mâdoi, [mâdoi̯], plural) from Old Persian Māda.) were an Iron Age Iranian people who spoke the Median language (Note: Diakonoff 1985, p. 140: "Archaeological evidence for the religion of the Iranian-speaking Medes of the first centuries of the 1st millennium B.C. comes so far only from the burials of "Necropolis B" in Tepe-Sialk, ascribed with some probability to the Medes; these are the usual ancient burials in pits, certainly not Zoroastrian." EIEC, p. 30: "By the seventh century BC the Urartian state was collapsing, ultimately in the face of the (Semitic) Babylonians and the Medes (Iranians of what is now northwestern Iran)." Kuz'mina 2007, p. 303: "Proto-Iranian split into Western (Median, ancient Persian, and others) and Eastern (Scythian, Ossetic, Saka, Pamir and others), and the direct genetic relation between the Scythian and Saka culture of the 7th–6th century BC and the Bronze Age culture of the Eurasian steppes identified by the retrospective method proves the Indo-Iranian character of the latter.") and who inhabited an area known as Media between western and northern Iran. Around the 11th century BC, they occupied the mountainous region of northwestern Iran and the northeastern and eastern region of Mesopotamia in the vicinity of Ecbatana (present-day Hamadan). Their consolidation in Iran is believed to have occurred during the 8th century BC. In the 7th century BC, all of western Iran and some other territories were under Median rule, but their precise geographic extent remains unknown.

Although widely recognized as playing an important role in the history of the ancient Near East, the Medes left no written records to reconstruct their history. Knowledge of the Medes comes only from foreign sources such as the Assyrians, Babylonians, Armenians and Greeks, as well as a few Iranian archaeological sites, which are believed to have been occupied by Medes. The accounts related to the Medes reported by Herodotus convey the image of a powerful people, who would have formed an empire at the beginning of the 7th century BC that lasted until the 550s BC, played a pivotal role in the fall of the Assyrian Empire, and competed with the powerful kingdoms of Lydia and Babylonia.

The state remains difficult to perceive in the documentation, which leaves many doubts about its extent. A recent reassessment of contemporary sources from the Median period has altered scholars' perceptions of the Median state, with some specialists even suggesting that there never was a powerful Median kingdom. In any case, it appears that after the fall of the last Median king against the Persian king Cyrus the Great, Media became an important province and was prized by the empires which successively dominated it (Achaemenids, Seleucids, Parthians and Sasanids).

== Etymology ==
The original source for their name and homeland is a directly transmitted Old Iranian geographical name which is attested as the Old Persian "Māda-" (singular masculine). The meaning of this word is not precisely known. However, the linguist W. Skalmowski proposes a relation with the proto-Indo European word "med(h)-", meaning "central, suited in the middle", by referring to the Old Indic "madhya-" and Old Iranian "maidiia-" which both carry the same meaning. The Latin medium, Greek méso, Armenian mej, and English mid are similarly derived from it.

Herodotus claimed that Greek legends, especially when similarities in names familiar to Greeks and used by foreign peoples were observed, could explain the origin of such an ethnonym. According to his Histories (ca.440 BC):

The Medes were formerly called by everyone Arians, but when the Colchian woman Medea came from Athens to the Arians, they changed their name, like the Persians [did after Perses, son of Perseus and Andromeda]. This is the Medes' own account of themselves.

== Archaeology ==
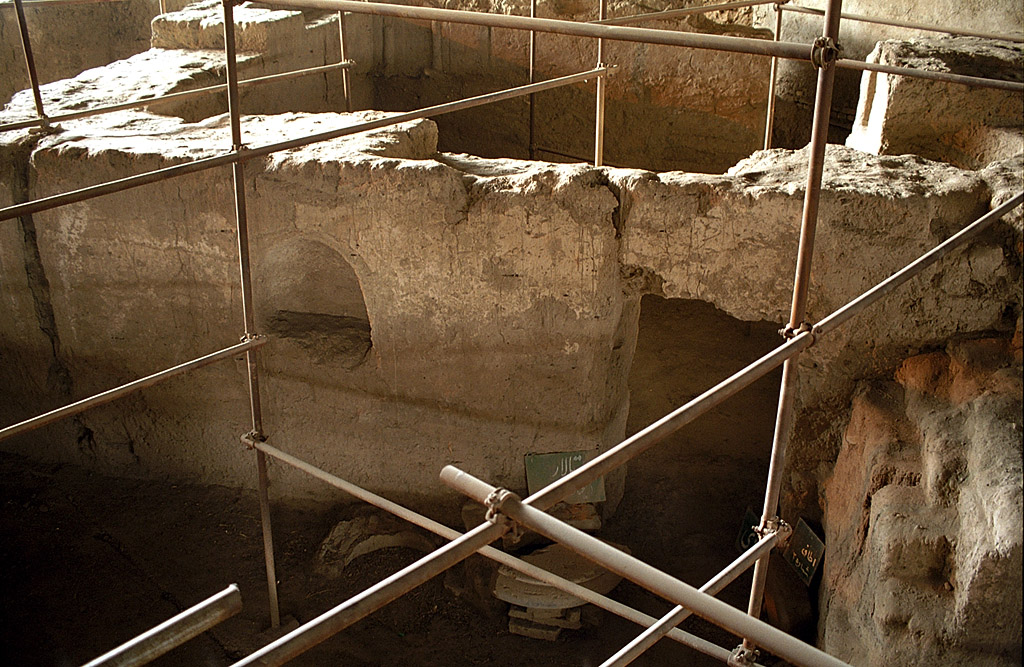
Excavation from ancient Ecbatana, Hamadan, Iran

The discoveries of Median sites in Iran happened only after the 1960s. Prior to the 1960s, the search for Median archeological sources has mostly focused in an area known as the "Median triangle", defined roughly as the region bounded by Hamadan and Malayer (in Hamadan province) and Kangavar (in Kermanshah province). Three major sites from central western Iran in the Iron Age III period (i.e. 850–500 BC) are:

- Tepe Nush-i Jan (a primarily religious site of Median period),

The site is located 14 km west of Malāyer in Hamadan province. The excavations started in 1967 with David Stronach as the director. The remains of four main buildings in the site are "the central temple, the western temple, the fort, and the columned hall" which according to Stronach were likely to have been built in the order named and predate the latter occupation of the first half of the 6th century BC. According to Stronach, the central temple, with its stark design, "provides a notable, if mute, expression of religious belief and practice". A number of ceramics from the Median levels at Tepe Nush-i Jan have been found which are associated with a period (the second half of the 7th century BC) of power consolidation in the Hamadān areas. These findings show four different wares known as "common ware" (buff, cream, or light red in colour and with gold or silver mica temper) including jars in various size the largest of which is a form of ribbed pithoi. Smaller and more elaborate vessels were in "grey ware", (these display smoothed and burnished surface). The "cooking ware" and "crumbly ware" are also recognized each in single handmade products.

- Godin Tepe (Godin Tepe's Level II: a fortified palace of a Median king or tribal chief),

The site is located 13 km east of Kangāvar city on the left bank of the river Gamas Āb". The excavations, started in 1965, were led by T. C. Young, Jr. According to David Stronach, the evidence shows an important Bronze Age construction that was reoccupied sometime before the beginning of the Iron III period. The excavations of Young indicate the remains of part of a single residence of a local ruler which later became quite substantial. This is similar to those mentioned often in Assyrian sources.

- Babajan (probably the seat of a lesser tribal ruler of Media).

The site is located in northeastern Lorestan with a distance of roughly 10 km from Nūrābād in Lorestan province. The excavations were conducted by C. Goff in 1966–69. The second level of this site probably dates to the 7th century BC.

These sources have both similarities (in cultural characteristics) and differences (due to functional differences and diversity among the Median tribes). The architecture of these archaeological findings, which can probably be dated to the Median period, show a link between the tradition of columned audience halls often seen in the Achaemenid Empire (for example in Persepolis) and Safavid Iran (for example in Chehel Sotoun from the 17th century AD) and what is seen in Median architecture.

The materials found at Tepe Nush-i Jan, Godin Tepe, and other sites located in Media, together with the Assyrian reliefs show the existence of urban settlements in Media in the first half of the 1st millennium BC which functioned as centres for the production of handicrafts and also of an agricultural and cattle-breeding economy of a secondary type. For other historical documentation, the archaeological evidence, though rare, together with Assyrian cuneiform records makes it possible, regardless of Herodotus' accounts, to establish some of the early history of the Medians.

== History ==
=== Origins ===
At the end of the 2nd millennium BC, the Iranian tribes emerged in the region of northwest Iran. These tribes expanded their control over larger areas. Iranian tribes were present in western and northwestern Iran from at least the 12th or 11th centuries BC. But the significance of Iranian elements in these regions were established from the beginning of the second half of the 8th century BC. By this time the Iranian tribes were the majority in what later become the territory of the Median Kingdom and also the west of Media proper. A study of textual sources from the region shows that in the Neo-Assyrian period, the regions of Media, and further to the west and the northwest, had a population with Iranian speaking people as the majority.

In western and northwestern Iran and in areas further west prior to Median rule, there is evidence of the earlier political activity of the powerful societies of Elam, Mannaea, Assyria and Urartu. There are various and updated opinions on the positions and activities of Iranian tribes in these societies prior to the "major Iranian state formations" in the late 7th century BC. One opinion (of Herzfeld, et al.) is that the ruling class were "Iranian migrants" but the society was "autonomous" while another opinion (of Grantovsky, et al.) holds that both the ruling class and basic elements of the population were Iranian.

The Medes first appear on the historical scene in the 9th century BCE, when they are mentioned in contemporary Assyrian texts. By this time, it is highly likely that Indo-Iranian-speaking peoples had already settled in Western Iran at least some 500 years — if not 1,000 years — prior to this period. Most scholars believe that the arrival of Indo-Iranian speaking populations into Western Iran was not the result of one mass migration, but instead small groups of nomadic pastoralists gradually infiltrated the region from the northeast over a long period of time, perhaps dating back to the early 2nd millennium BCE. These pastoralist groups gave rise to diverse cultural and linguistic groups, with one such group eventually coalescing into the people referred to by the Assyrians as the Medes. From the 9th century BCE onwards the Medes were well established in Western Iran and frequently clashed with the Assyrians, their powerful neighbors to the west.

=== Assyrian intervention in Median territories ===
At the start of the Iron Age, Zagros Mountains and the Iranian Plateau were politically fragmented in the extreme. The Assyrian sources of the 8th and 7th centuries BCE tell of a bewildering number of kings and chieftains who ruled areas of different sizes, most of which seem to have been very small. In referring to the Median rulers, the Assyrian texts use the title bēl āli (meaning "city lord"), a term for petty rulers who were not important enough to be called kings. Since there are no very large settlements in Median territory, bēl āli is sometimes translated as "chief" or "chieftain". From the Assyrian perspective, the Medes were a strange people living beyond the eastern fringes of the civilized world. Shalmaneser III (858-824 BC) was the first Assyrian king who made serious efforts to extend the power of his kingdom beyond the reaches of northern Mesopotamia, and he was the first Assyrian king to reach the Iranian Plateau. Although his army operated near Median territories in 843, 827, and 826 BCE, the Medes are not mentioned in the reports on these campaigns. Only once, in 834, did Shalmaneser sally forth from Parsua in order to attack four settlements in the regions of "Messi, Amadaya, Araziaš and Harhar." Among these, Amadaya can be identified as Media. Shalmaneser's attack was, however, a mere side show without any consequences since Media was not the focus of Shalmaneser's attention.

The Assyrian interest in the Iranian highlands probably stemmed from their need for horses to supply the chariots and cavalry of their armed forces. For most of the 9th century BCE, the Assyrians found what they needed in the Zagros Mountains, in areas closer to the Assyrian heartland and more accessible. However, the situation changed when the kingdom of Urartu expanded into the areas south of Lake Urmia, thus cutting off Assyria's most convenient connection with central Iran. This prompted Assyria to seek new and more reliable access routes connecting Assyria with horse-breeding areas far from Urartian interference. This attracted Assyria's attention to the Medes, renowned for their wealth of horses. In a campaign in 819 or 818 BCE, Shamshi-Adad V (823-811 BCE) led Assyrian forces deep into western Iran. Advancing through Mesa, Gizilbunda, Mataya (Media), and Araziaš, he followed the path previously taken by Shalmaneser III in 834 BCE. During this expedition, Assyrian forces encountered and fought a ruler named Hanaşiruka in Media. According to Shamshi-Adad's inscriptions, they purportedly killed 2,300 of Hanaşiruka's warriors and 140 cavalrymen, and Hanaşiruka's royal city of Sagbita was destroyed, along with 1,200 other settlements. However, considering later campaigns in the region, these figures seem exaggerated. Hanaşiruka fared better than his neighboring rulers, the king of Gizilbunda and the ruler of Araziaš. Hanaşiruka not only survived the assault but also did not submit to the Assyrian king and apparently had no booty taken from his land. While only a fraction of the Median territories was affected by Shamshi-Adad's incursion, this marked the first of a series of Assyrian attempts to exert its power over the horse breeders of western Iran. Between 810 and 766 BCE, at least seven and possibly as many as nine Assyrian campaigns were directed against Media, climaxing in the years 793-787 BCE when Nergal-ila'i, the commander-in-chief of Adad-nirari III (810-783 BCE), led no fewer than five expeditions east-ward.

The earliest Assyrian incursions into the Zagros region seem to have focused mainly on plunder. It is only under the king Tiglath-Pileser III (744-727 BCE) and his successors that the Assyrians attempted to take direct control of Median territory by founding new Assyrian provinces in the western Zagros. They also converted some Median towns to Assyrian centers, renaming them with the prefix kār, which meant "harbor" or "trading station". Their new names highlight their central role in commerce. In the course of his campaigns, Tiglath-Pileser III established two new provinces, expanding the permanent Assyrian presence much further onto the Iranian Plateau. East of the existing Assyrian province of Zamua (established no later than 843 BCE), Tiglath-Pileser founded the province of Parsua. Additionally, the province of Namri, likely established in the 790s BCE, now shared a border with the newly created province of Bit-Hamban. The Assyrian overland route connecting the Median territories with the Mesopotamian lowlands now reached as far as the strategically significant city of Harhar on the Iranian Plateau. In 738 BCE, Tiglath-Pileser sent an army detachment against "the mighty Medes in the east", likely in the region beyond Mount Alvand. The operation was successful, with the Assyrians capturing the settlement of Mulugani and capturing "5,000 horses, people, oxen, sheep and goats."

Sargon II (721-705 BCE) resumed efforts to strengthen the Assyrian Empire's grip on western Iran even further. This renewed advance was a highly concentrated affair, accomplished in just four years from 716 to 713 BCE, during which time the Median lands were invaded no fewer than three times. Most chiefs who paid tribute in 714 BCE, did not do so again in 713 BCE, which shows that even when the Assyrian Empire's involvement with the Median territories was at its absolute peak, only a small fraction of the Median chiefs in power established a lasting relationship with the Assyrian conqueror. The majority anticipated that Assyrian forces would eventually withdraw, as they had done in the past. However, the establishment of fortresses in Harhar and Kišesim in 716 BCE marked a turning point. From then on, the Assyrians maintained a permanent presence in western Iran.

However, the effectiveness of Assyrian rule was still limited and remained weak, especially in areas east of the Zagros mountain range. Since direct control over the Medes was challenging to keep, deals were made with those local rulers. In exchange for recognizing the Assyrian king's authority, providing a fixed quantity of horses as tribute, and fulfilling other obligations, cooperative chiefs received the protection of the Assyrian Empire and retained the freedom to govern their subjects as they deemed fit. This compromise usually suited both sides well. Sargon II undertook another expedition to Media in 708 BCE but was unable to achieve his goal of conquering all Median lands or establishing stable control over them. Subsequently, the tribes on the Iranian plateau opposing Assyrian dominance consolidated their efforts against it. By the end of the 8th century BCE, the first major unions and states based on tribal confederations began to emerge in the western Iranian territory, led by local chiefs. While during Sargon II's reign, the Medes seemed contained through diplomacy and the strategic backing of competing factions, by the time of his grandson Esarhaddon (680-669 BCE), the Assyrians appeared to have lost ground in Media. Records from this period indicate unrest in the Median provinces. In inquiries directed to the god Shamash, the king seeks guidance on the power of the Medes and their allies, the Cimmerians and Manneans. Notably, the bēl-āli of Karkaššî, Kashtariti, becomes the focus of the king's concern. Even the once routine collection of horse tribute from the Medes now encounters unexpected difficulties.

Political maps of the Ancient Near East in 700 BC (top) and 600 BC (bottom)

The adê tablets record the oaths made by eight Zagros-dwelling bēl-ālāni who swore loyalty to Esarhaddon and his crown prince Ashurbanipal (668-631 BCE). The interpretation of these oaths has been a subject of debate, ranging from vassal treaties to the swearing in of a corps of Median bodyguards to the crown prince. The discovery of a very similar tablet from the Syrian site of Tell Tayinat points to an empire-wide attempt at making all allies swear allegiance to the crown-prince before Esarhaddon's death. Six years prior one of these bēl-ālāni, Ramataya of Urakazabarna, had visited the Assyrian court. He brought tribute in the form of horses and lapis lazuli, seeking Esarhaddon's assistance against rival bēl-ālāni. However, it appears that the oaths and alliances eventually fell apart, leading to the tablets that documented them being taken from the temple storage room and crushed. While, by the mid-seventh century, the Median bēl-ālāni seemed poised to form alliances that could have united against the Assyrians, there is no indication that the fundamental political structure of the Medes as independent bēl-ālāni was undergoing significant changes as Herodotus's story of Deioces's rise would suggest. The last mention of Median bēl-ālāni comes from an inscription of Ashurbanipal that recounts a campaign of 656 BCE, in which three Median bēl-ālāni rebelled and were captured and brought back to Nineveh. As it became conceivable for a united Media to defeat Assyria and assume her mantle of power in the region, the impetus to unite may have been stronger than the competitive forces dividing the bēl-ālāni.

After 670 BCE, susceptible to Scythian and Cimmerian raids and facing the decline of trade along the Great Khorasan Road, many Median chiefdoms probably collapsed leaving fewer chiefs to compete for power. The states of non-Iranian peoples like the Manneans, Elippians, and Kassites probably collapsed as well, which allowed Median groups to take over their territory. With fewer chiefs remaining, one of them might have risen to the position of paramount chief, subjugating his former equals. Cyaxares probably rose to prominence in this context. He may indeed have fought the Scythians, as Herodotus claims, which may have earned him his reputation as a great warrior. Through his victories, Cyaxares gained more and more influence, eventually uniting the Medes and other peoples under his leadership.

=== Rise and fall ===
Timeline of Pre-Achaemenid era.

From the 10th to the late 7th centuries BCE, the western parts of Media fell under the domination of the vast Neo-Assyrian Empire, which stretched from Cyprus in the west, to parts of western Iran in the east, and Egypt and the north of the Arabian Peninsula. During the reign of Sinsharishkun (622–612 BCE), the Assyrian empire, which had been in a state of constant civil war since 626 BCE, began to unravel. Subject peoples, such as the Babylonians, Egyptians, Scythians, Cimmerians, and Arameans quietly ceased to pay tribute to Assyria.

Assyrian dominance over the Medes came to an end during the reign of Median king Cyaxares, who, in alliance with the Babylonian king Nabopolassar, attacked and destroyed the strife-riven Neo-Assyrian Empire between 616 and 609 BCE. After the fall of Assyria, a unified Median state became one of the four major powers of the ancient Near East together with Babylonia, Lydia, and Egypt. The Medes were subsequently able to expand beyond their original homeland and had eventually a territory stretching roughly from northeastern Iran to the Kızılırmak River in Anatolia.

Cyaxares was succeeded by his son Astyages. In 553 BCE, Cyrus the Great, the King of Persia, a Median vassal, revolted against the Median king. In 550 BCE, Cyrus finally won a decisive victory resulting in Astyages' capture by his own dissatisfied nobles, who promptly turned him over to the triumphant Cyrus.

==== Median dynasty ====
In Herodotus (I, 95–130), Deioces is introduced as the founder of a centralized Median state. He had been known to the Median people as "a just and incorruptible man" and when asked by the Median people to solve their possible disputes he agreed and put forward the condition that they make him "king" and build a great city at Ecbatana as the capital of the Median state. Judging from the contemporary sources of the region, and disregarding the account of Herodotus, puts the formation of a unified Median state during the reign of Cyaxares or later.

The list of Median rulers and their period of reign is compiled according to two sources. Firstly, Herodotus who calls them "kings" and associates them with the same family. Secondly, the Babylonian Chronicles which in "Gadd's Chronicle on the Fall of Nineveh" gives its own list. A combined list stretching over 150 years is thus:

- Deioces (700s–675 BC)
- Phraortes (675–653 BC)
- Scythian rule (652–624 BC)
- Cyaxares (624–585 BC)
- Astyages (585–550 BC)

However, not all of these dates and personalities given by Herodotus match the other near eastern sources.

=== Later history ===
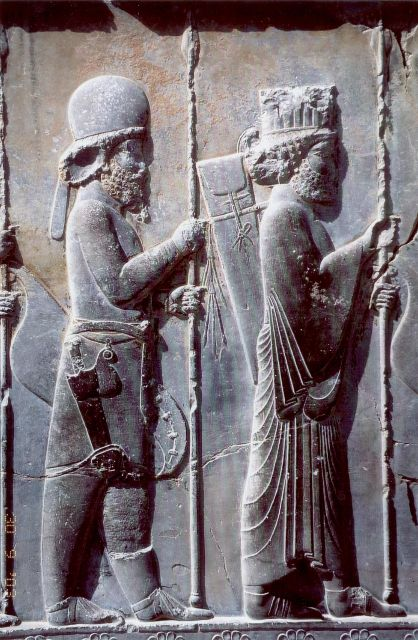
The Apadana Palace, 5th century BCE Achaemenid bas-relief shows a Median soldier behind a Persian soldier, in Persepolis, Iran

After Cyrus's victory against Astyages, the Medes were subjected to their close kin, the Persians. In the new empire they retained a prominent position; in honour and war, they stood next to the Persians; their court ceremony was adopted by the new sovereigns, who in the summer months resided in Ecbatana; and many noble Medes were employed as officials, satraps and generals.

In later periods, Medes and especially Median soldiers are identified and portrayed prominently in ancient archaeological sites such as Persepolis, where they are shown to have a major role and presence in the military of the Persian Achaemenid Empire. The Medes within the Achaemenid Empire enjoyed a similar status to the Persians and made up a large part of its ruling class, so much so that the Greek frequently called the Persians, Medes and coined the term "Medizing" to refer to "pro-Persian" policies.

== Culture and society ==
=== Society ===
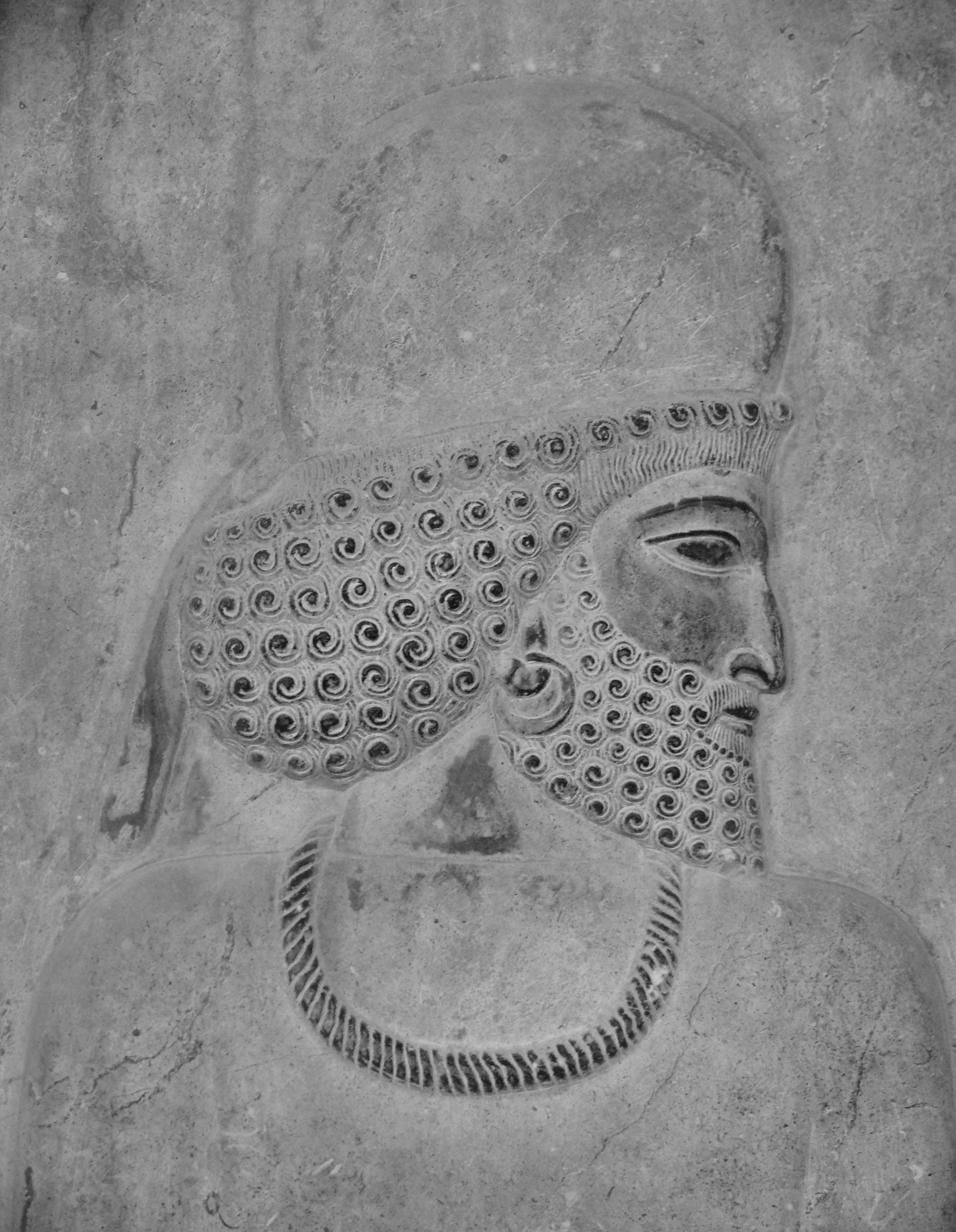
Stone relief of a Median man

The almost complete lack of written material makes it difficult to know how the Medes conceived their society. According to Herodotus, Persian society during the reign of Cyrus the Great was composed of 'numerous tribes' (génea), and each tribe was divided into 'clans' (phrātría). This general outline by the Greek historian reflects the concept that the social groups individuals belonged to were family, clan, tribe, and country. Although clan affiliations or tribal connections of significant individuals are rarely mentioned in Achaemenid period texts, the Persians still identified themselves through their relationships with family (paternal name), clan, and tribe. It is quite likely that the Medes did the same, as, according to Herodotus, their nation was also composed of tribes (génēa).

Assyrian inscriptions use the unusual term "bēl-āli" for the Median leaders, a term that is occasionally applied also to other rulers of polities in the Zagros mountains, but otherwise unknown in the Assyrian records. Literally translated the term means "head of a city" but it has been variously translated as "chieftain", "city leader", or "city lord". The term as used by the Assyrians is probably also a reflection of their own interpretation of a power structure that was unfamiliar to them and could only be rendered in terms that the Assyrians themselves understood. It is clear from Assyrian sources that the position of bēl-āli could be hereditary. The Assyrian sources do not provide any information about the organizational structure above the level of chieftains, and the inner structure of these Median chiefdoms remain largely unknown. According to Herodotus, the Medes were divided into six tribes: Busai, Paretakenians, Struchates, Arizantians, Budians, and Magians. The name of these tribes appear to be completely unknown to the Assyrians despite centuries of direct contact with various Median groups. Only the name of Herodotus's Paretakenians sounds similar to the lands of Partakka and Partukka, whose chieftains sought help from the Assyrian king Esarhaddon (680-669 BC). If any tribal structures existed from the 9th to the 7th century BC, their political significance was likely minimal. Contrary to expectations, the Medes' internal rivalries did not result in the concentration of land, wealth, and power in the hands of a steadily decreasing number of chieftains over time, the opposite occurred. In 819 BC, a small number of Median chiefs fielded considerably stronger forces against Assyria than their more numerous descendants did in the later half of the 8th century BC, when they were attacked by Tiglath-Pileser III and Sargon II. This suggests that sons of chieftains had equal inheritance rights, leading to the division of their father's lands, increasing the number of chiefdoms, and accelerating Media's political fragmentation. Sargon II's inscriptions alone identify at least 55 Median chiefdoms, and considering that there were likely additional less important chiefdoms not mentioned in Assyrian records, the total number could have been close to a hundred or even more.

Presumably the tribal union of the Medes was not merely nominal. It is to this union that the Medes must have owed at times the possibility of collective action with a choice of capable leaders. But such unity could manifest itself only occasionally. In the majority of the cases the Medes, in spite of their strength, were divided. The six Median tribes resided in Media proper, the triangular area between Rhagae, Aspadana and Ecbatana. In present-day Iran, that is the area between Tehran, Isfahan and Hamadan, respectively. Of the Median tribes, the Magi resided in Rhagae, modern Tehran. They were of a sacred caste which ministered to the spiritual needs of the Medes. The Paretaceni tribe resided in and around Aspadana, modern Isfahan, the Arizanti lived in and around Kashan (Isfahan Province), and the Busae tribe lived in and around the future Median capital of Ecbatana, near modern Hamadan. The Struchates and the Budii lived in villages in the Median triangle.

The family life of the Medes was based on patriarchal authority and polygamy was permitted. Strabo (Geogr. XI, 13.11) mentions a peculiar law applied to all Medes – a law requiring every man to have no fewer than five wives. It is very unlikely that such a burden would actually be obligatory on anyone: most likely only five lawful wives, and no more, were permitted by the aforementioned law, just as four wives, and no more, are legal for Muslims. The Medes had "cities", probably small fortified settlements like those identified archaeologically. These locations were characterized by fortifications, warehouses, worship buildings, and ceremonial structures. The common population did not reside within these places, nor necessarily in immediate proximity; it is presumed they inhabited small villages or pastoral camps.

The Medes are portrayed in the reliefs of Persepolis, dating back to 515 BCE, just 35 years after the fall of the Median Kingdom. The reliefs depicting the Medes appear in three locations, showing guards, nobles, and their delegations. The reason for their frequent representation lies in the fact that the Medes held a privileged status in the Achaemenid Empire. The first relief shows four Medes and Persian spearmen. In this relief, the Medes wear short coats, trousers, and round caps, under which they seem to have curly hair.

=== Religion ===
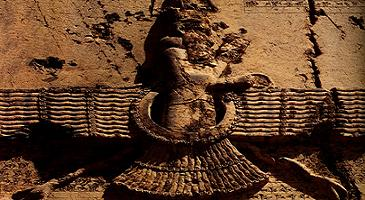
Faravahar, a symbol of Zoroastrianism

Information about the religion of the Medes is very limited. Primary sources pointing to their religious affiliations include the archaeological discoveries in Tepe Nush-i Jan, personal names of Median individuals, and the Histories of Herodotus. Between 1967 and 1977, David Stronach excavated a building at Tepe Nush-i Jan that had been built around 750 BC and appears to be mainly religious in character. The building was erected on a rock about 30 meters high and included a "Central Sanctuary", "Western Sanctuary", "Fortress" and "Columned Hall", which were surrounded by a circular brick support wall. The Central Sanctuary was tower-shaped with a triangular inner altar. Its space is 11×7 meters and the walls are eight meters high. Near the west corner of the altar, a stepped fire altar constructed of mud bricks was discovered. As is known, the cult of fire was a common Indo-Iranian legacy. According to Herodotus, the Medes had a priestly caste called the Magi, who were one of the tribes of this people. They had the right or privilege to serve as priests not only for the Medes but also for the Persians. Thus, they constituted a priestly caste that passed its functions from father to son. They played a significant role in the court of the Median king Astyages, serving as advisers, sorcerers, dream interpreters, and soothsayers. Classical authors regarded the Magi as Zoroastrian priests. From the personal names of Medes as recorded by Assyrian texts from 8th and 9th centuries BCE there are examples of the use of the Indo-Iranian word arta- (lit. "truth") or theophoric names with Maždakku and even the name of the god Ahura Mazda, which is familiar from both Avestan and Old Persian.

The religion promoted by the Magi could be some form of pre-Zoroastrianism or Zoroastrianism itself. This is a controversial topic on which scholars have not yet reached a consensus. Igor Diakonoff supposed that Astyages and perhaps even Cyaxares had already adopted a religion derived from the teachings of Zoroaster (although not necessarily identical with his doctrine). Mary Boyce argued that the existence of the Magi in Media with their own traditions and forms of worship was an obstacle to Zoroastrian proselytism there. Boyce wrote that the Zoroastrian traditions in the Median city of Ray probably goes back to the 8th century BCE. It is suggested that from the 8th century BCE, a form of "Mazdaism with common Iranian traditions" existed in Media and the strict reforms of Zarathustra began to spread in western Iran during the reign of the last Median kings in the 6th century BCE. It is also possible that the Medes may have practised Mithraism, with Mithra as their supreme deity.

=== Language ===
Median people spoke the Median language, which was an Old Iranian language. Strabo's Geographica (finished in the early first century) mentions the affinity of Median with other Iranian languages: "The name of Ariana is further extended to a part of Persia and of Media, as also to the Bactrians and Sogdians on the north; for these speak approximately the same language, but with slight variations".

No original deciphered text has been proven to have been written in the Median language. It is suggested that similar to the later Iranian practice of keeping archives of written documents in Achaemenid Iran, there was also a maintenance of archives by the Median government in their capital Ecbatana. There are examples of "Median literature" found in later records. One is according to Herodotus that the Median king Deioces, appearing as a judge, made judgement on causes submitted in writing. There is also a report by Dinon on the existence of "Median court poets". Median literature is part of the "Old Iranian literature" (including also Saka, Old Persian, Avestan) as this Iranian affiliation of them is explicit also in ancient texts, such as Herodotus's account that many peoples including Medes were "universally called Iranian".

No documents dated from the Median period have been preserved. Only one bronze plate dating from the pre-Achaemenid period has been found in Median territory, bearing a cuneiform inscription in Akkadian dating back to the 8th century BCE, but it does not mention any Median names. A cuneiform inscription on a piece of silver was excavated at Tepe Nush-i Jan, but only the end of one sign and the beginning of the next were preserved. If writing was employed by the Medes, it likely utilized a script similar to Aramaic that was written on perishable materials since no historical accounts, literary texts, bureaucratic records, or even commercial transaction records survived. Some small elements of the Median language have been reconstructed from place names, personal names, and some suggested Median linguistic remnants in Old Persian. Numerous non-Persian words in Old Persian texts are commonly assumed to be Median, and other Median forms are preserved in Akkadian versions of Achaemenid inscriptions and elsewhere. The Median words in Old Persian texts, whose Median origin can be established by "phonetic criteria", appear more frequently among royal titles and among terms of the chancellery, military, and judicial affairs according to Rüdiger Schmitt. It's likely that the Median language differed only dialectically from Old Persian.

=== Art and architecture ===
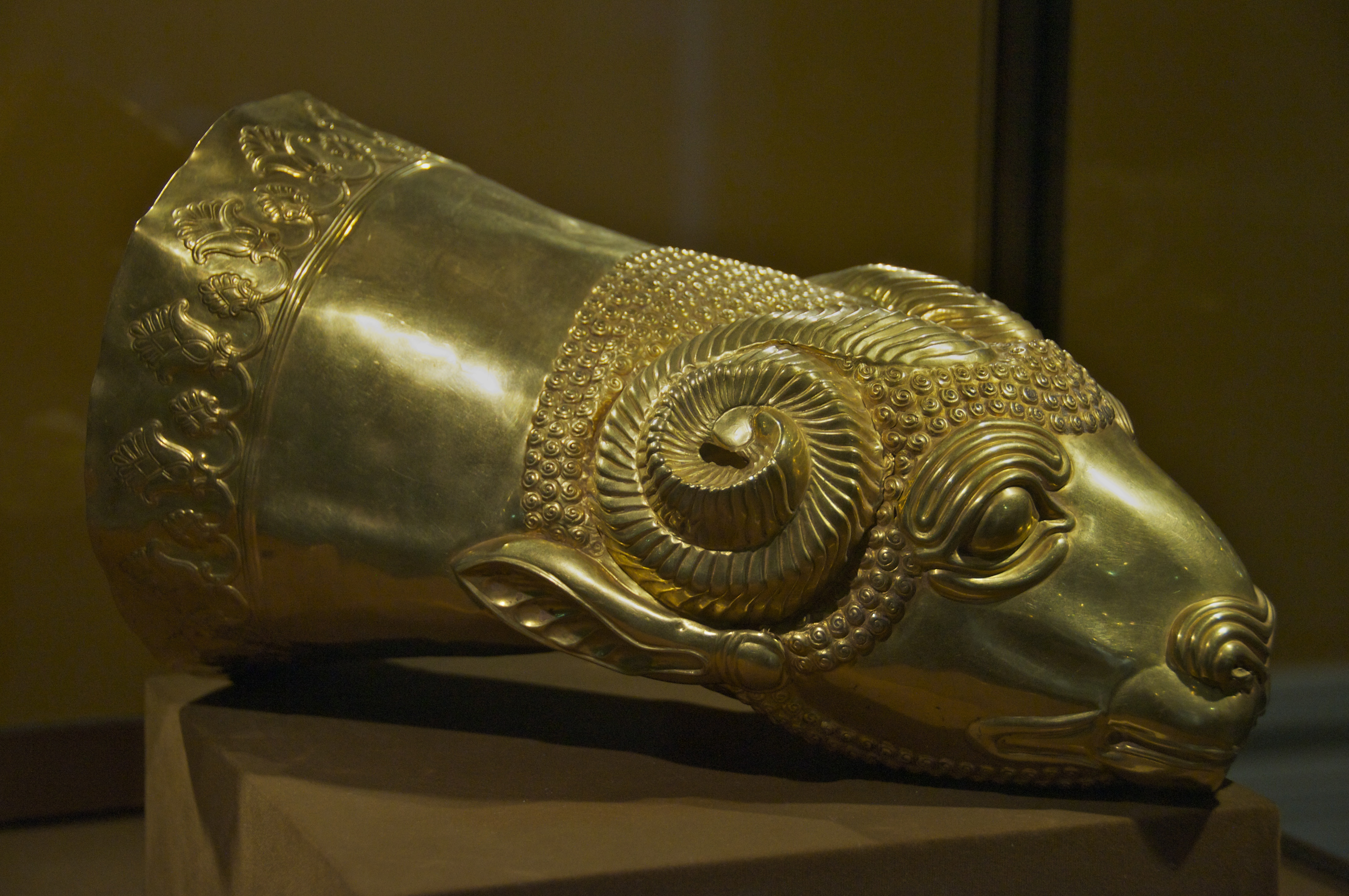
Rhyton in the shape of a ram's head, gold – Kurdistan - western Iran –, late 7th–early 6th century BCE

Very little remains of the material culture of the Medes, and it is challenging to confidently attribute artifacts from the period before the Persian Empire to the Medes specifically or to other groups residing in western Iran during the Iron Age. For this reason, Median art remains a purely speculative topic, and its existence is even denied by some scholars. Géza de Francovitch noted that there is not a single work conclusively of Median origin in the archaeological record. This observation appears to remain relevant, even after the excavation of two seemingly Median sites in western Iran and the emergence of more academic writings claiming to have unraveled and understood the characteristics of Median art. Still, other scholars presume that archaeological sites such as Tepe Nush-i Jan and Godin Tepe, located in Media and dating back to the 8th and 7th centuries BCE, are examples supporting the existence of Median art. Although Tepe Nush-i Jan was not a capital, according to David Stronach, it became a crucial link in a chain of evidence regarding the composition and development of Median architecture, as well as the incorporation of Median culture into ancient Eastern civilizations. Influence and direct borrowing of fine details, entire architectural forms, and building design that had precise analogs in Assyrian and Urartian art can be traced in the architecture of Tepe Nus-i Jã and Godin Tepe. The Medes not only borrowed some elements from foreign art but also used them in new contexts with new functions and meanings, that is, in a new context without their typical and initial qualities. Later, the Achaemenids borrowed cultural achievements from the ancient Near East through the Medes. J. Curtis argues against the minimalist position that there is nothing readily identifiable as Median art, but rather asserts that those objects that may be characterized as Median were heavily influenced by Assyrian art. Objects in a style halfway Assyrian, halfway Achaemenid, are often attributed to Median art.

Herodotus provides a description of the palace of Deioces in Ecbatana, stating that it was an architectural complex built on a hill and surrounded by seven concentric walls, with each battlement of a wall surpassing that of the wall next outside it. The palace itself and the royal treasures were located within the innermost circle. The battlements of these circles would have been painted with seven different colors, indicating that the Medes developed a rich polychrome; and the two innermost circles were covered with silver and gold, respectively. The artistic contributions of Median goldsmiths are also mentioned in Persian records.

Pictorial art has been excavated in small quantities and of somewhat disappointing quality so far. Evidence shows that Median pictorial art was heavily influenced by the Babylonians, Assyrians, Elamites, and perhaps the early phase of the 'animal style' of the Ancient Near East. In Hamadan, a bronze plate was discovered with the inscription of a king of Abadana, a small kingdom west of Assyrian outposts. The plate depicts the king dressed similarly to Babylonian attire from the late Kassite period. Another inscribed object is a cylinder seal with a hero fighting a monster, the scene and inscription style related to the Elamite style in Susa, but the hero's headdress is typical of the Medes in Achaemenid palace reliefs. Other findings include a crude-style cylinder seal impression from Nush-i Jan and cylinder seals in various Mesopotamian styles from the ruins and vicinity of Hamadan, some dating back to the 8th and 7th centuries BCE. These findings reveal a strong influence from other civilizations but lack distinctive traits of authentic Median art. Local craftsmanship is indicated by excavated bronze jars. Architectural painting, attested in both Baba Jan and Nush-i Jan, can be compared to the not-so-sophisticated geometric style found in Tepe Sialk. R. D. Barnett argued that the so-called Scythian style, more precisely the earliest phase of this style, was also part of contemporary Median art (late 8th century BCE). However, this theory has not been proven or refuted so far.

A passage from the Babylonian Chronicle records that after the conquest of Ecbatana, Cyrus took the silver, gold, goods, and properties of the city to Persia. While the exact nature of these precious metals and goods is not specified, except for being portable material, it is possible that Median artisanal objects, as well as state or religious items, were among the spoils.

Greek references to "Median" people make no clear distinction between the "Persians" and the "Medians"; in fact for a Greek to become "too closely associated with Iranian culture" was "to become Medianized, not Persianized". The Median kingdom was a short-lived Iranian state and the textual and archaeological sources of that period are rare and little could be known from the Median culture.

=== Economy ===
The basic economic resource in the region was pastoralism, as indicated in the records of Assyrian raids and tributes. A primary factor for economic development was the breeding of valuable breeds, such as horses for military use and Bactrian camels for commercial transport. The proximity to the Assyrian Empire, as well as to Urartu, Elam, and Babylon, made the breeding of these animals highly profitable. However, the most crucial economic factor was the strategic location of the Medes along the main trade route, the Silk Road, connecting Mesopotamia to Central Asia.

Assyrian palace reliefs depict inhabitants of the eastern mountain regions wearing the same tunics, sheepskin coats, lace-up boot, and hairstyles. This visual evidence suggests a similarity in the lifeways of the Western Iranian peoples, with no apparent significant distinctions among the Medes and their neighbors. The only direct references to the Median lifestyle occur in a literary text from the 7th century BCE, known as the "Sargon Geography", mentioning one Median chiefdom, Karzinu, reached by Assyrian forces in 716 BCE. As usual, non-Mesopotamian foreigners are characterized negatively, by listing the Assyrian cultural elements that the foreigners supposedly lacked. The description of the people of Karzinu makes it clear that they differed in quite a number of respects, including hairstyle, funerary practices, and diet, from the cultural habits of the western parts of the Assyrian Empire.

Median livestock breeders probably practiced transhumance, inhabiting their settlements in winter and spending the summer on pastures high in the mountains. The information gleaned from the Sargon campaign provides a rare reference to Median farming, suggesting a robust rural economy combining livestock breeding and farming, albeit lacking notable crafts or industries worth mentioning. The degree to which the Medes participated in the trade that passed through their territories between Mesopotamia and the lands further east is unknown. Assyrians received various goods from the Medes, including horses, mules, Bactrian camels, oxen, sheep, and goats. However, there is an absence of sophisticated finished products like precious textiles, metalwork, or furniture, and no luxury goods except for lapis lazuli.

The Medes were defined by their life in the Zagros Mountains. They sowed grain in the broad valleys and pastured their animals on the hillsides, moving from summer to winter pastures as the weather demanded. The Medes raised sheep, goat, and cattle for meat, milk, and wool, but it was the Median horses that were considered their most treasured resource. The Medes were known for their horsemanship, and when the Assyrians demanded tribute from them it was almost always in the form of horses trained for riding.

== Mythology ==
In the Greek myth of Jason and the Argonauts, Medea is the daughter of King Aeëtes of Colchis and a paternal granddaughter of the sun-god Helios. Following her failed marriage to Jason while in Corinth, for one of several reasons depending on the version, she marries King Aegeus of Athens and bears a son Medus. After failing to make Aegeus kill his older son Theseus, she and her son fled to Aria, where the Medes take their name from her, according to several Greek and later Roman accounts, including in Pausanias' Description of Greece (1st-century AD). According to other versions, such as in Strabo's Geographica (1st-century AD) and Justin's Epitoma Historiarum Philippicarum (2nd or 3rd century AD), she returned home to conquer neighboring lands with her husband Jason, one of which was named after her; while another version related by Diodorus Siculus in Bibliotheca Historica (1st-century BC) states that after being exiled she married an Asian king and bore Medus, who was greatly admired for his courage, after whom they took their name.

== Kurds and Medes ==
Various historians have suggested a link between the Medes and the Kurds. One of the earliest historical texts often cited to support this connection is the Kārnāmag-ī Ardaxšīr-ī Pābagān (Book of the Deeds of Ardashir). In this text, which narrates the rise of Ardashir I (d. 242 AD), the Sassanid king battles a local ruler named Madig, who is referred to as the 'King of the Kurds' (Madig î Kurdan Şâh). Some scholars interpret the name 'Madig' as a reference to 'Mede', suggesting a sociopolitical continuity between the Medes and the Kurds in the perception of the late Sassanid era.

Russian historian and linguist Vladimir Minorsky suggested that the Medes, who widely inhabited the land where currently the Kurds form a majority, might have been forefathers of the modern Kurds. He also states that the Medes who invaded the region in the eighth century BC linguistically resembled the Kurds. This view was accepted by many Kurdish nationalists in the twentieth century. However, Martin van Bruinessen, a Dutch scholar, argues against the attempt to identify the Medes as ancestors of the Kurds:

Though some Kurdish intellectuals claim that their people are descended from the Medes, there is no evidence to permit such a connection across the considerable gap in time between the political dominance of the Medes and the first attestation of the Kurds

—van Bruinessen

Contemporary linguistic evidence has challenged the previously suggested view that the Kurds are descendants of the Medes. Gernot Ludwig Windfuhr, professor of Iranian Studies, identified the Kurdish languages as Parthian, albeit with a Median substratum. David Neil MacKenzie, an authority on the Kurdish language, said Kurdish was closer to Persian and questioned the "traditional" view holding that Kurdish, because of its differences from Persian, should be regarded as a Northwestern Iranian language. The Kurdologist and Iranologist Garnik Asatrian stated that "The Central Iranian dialects, and primarily those of the Kashan area in the first place, as well as the Azari dialects (otherwise called Southern Tati) are probably the only Iranian dialects, which can pretend to be the direct offshoots of Median... In general, the relationship between Kurdish and Median is not closer than the affinities between the latter and other North Western dialects – Baluchi, Talishi, South Caspian, Zaza, Gurani, Kurdish (Soranî, Kurmancî, Kelhorî). Asatrian also stated that "there is no serious ground to suggest a special genetic affinity within North-Western Iranian between this ancient language [Median] and Kurdish. The latter does not share even the generally ephemeric peculiarity of Median."

According to Shahbazi, the Medes were ancestors of many Iranians, particularly the Kurds. To Jwaideh, "The empire of the Medes, one of the reputed ancestors of the Kurdish people, was the only great national state that may be said to have been established by the Kurds." In Kurdish mythology and tradition, the Medes are regarded as the ancestral roots of the Kurdish people. The rise of the Median Kingdom is often associated with the legend of Kawa the Blacksmith (the Newroz legend), who led an uprising against the tyrant Zahak and ended his rule on the day of the vernal equinox. This myth places the Medes in a central position within Kurdish tradition, both historically and symbolically.

According to The Cambridge History of the Kurds:

Although some Kurdish authors have claimed descendants for Kurdish from Avestan and Median, a direct link of Kurdish with Avestan was ruled out in Iranian philology even back in its initial stages (cf. Rödiger and Pott, 1842, cited in Lecoq, 1997: 31), while Avestan, although its classification is also unresolved, is traditionally considered to be closer to Eastern Iranian languages (cf. Korn, 2016: 403). Furthermore, the purported relationship of Kurdish to the Median language, although defended by Minorsky based mostly on conjectural historical evidence (Minorsky, 1940: 143–6), is not supported by linguistic evidence, since information about the Median language is extremely limited and indirect, being mostly restricted to the loanwords found in the Old Persian inscriptions (Lecoq, 1987: 674).4 As Lecoq (1997: 31) states in relation to the Kurdish–Median connection, everything is possible but nothing is demonstrable. But even the limited data at hand provide evidence against Kurdish–Median genetic affinity (Asatrian, 2009: 21; MacKenzie, 1999: 675–6; Rossi, 2010: 308). Refuting thus the Median origin of Kurdish, MacKenzie (1961) outlined a picture of the evolution of North-western Iranian languages where Kurdish and Persian evolved in parallel and therefore Kurdish "represented an early splitting from the linguistic subgroup of Median" (cf. Rossi, 2010: 307–8). Likewise, in his survey of major isoglosses in the historical phonology of West Iranian languages, Windfuhr (1975: 458) concluded on the basis of these facts (and with regard to the subsequent migration of the Kurds into the Median territory – explained below) that Kurdish can probably not be considered a 'Median' dialect neither linguistically nor geographically, stating further that the modern Iranian languages of Azerbaijan (originally 'Aturpatakan') and Central Iran (e.g. Sivandi) are Median dialects (Windfuhr, 2009: 15).

== Bibliography ==
- Boyce, Mary; Grenet, Frantz (1991), Zoroastrianism under Macedonian and Roman rule, Brill, ISBN 978-90-04-09271-6
- Bryce, Trevor (2009), The Routledge Handbook of the Peoples and Places of Ancient Western Asia. From the Early Bronze Age to the Fall of the Persian Empire, Taylor & Francis
- Dandamaev, M. A.; Lukonin, V. G.; Kohl, P. L.; Dadson, D. J. (2004), The Culture and Social Institutions of Ancient Iran, Cambridge, UK: Cambridge University Press, ISBN 978-0-521-61191-6
- Dandamayev, M.; Medvedskaya, I. (2006), "Media", Encyclopaedia Iranica Online Edition, archived from the original on 30 August 2017
- Diakonoff, I. M. (1985), "Media", in Ilya Gershevitch (ed.), The Cambridge History of Iran, vol. 2, Cambridge, UK: Cambridge University Press, pp. 36–148, ISBN 978-0-521-20091-2
- Gershevitch, I. (1968), "Old Iranian Literature", Iranian Studies, Hanbuch Der Orientalistik – Abeteilung – Der Nahe Und Der Mittlere Osten, vol. 1, Brill, pp. 1–30, ISBN 978-90-04-00857-1
- Henrickson, R. C. (1988), "Baba Jan Teppe", Encyclopaedia Iranica, vol. 2, Routledge & Kegan Paul, ISBN 978-0-933273-67-2, archived from the original on 13 August 2011
- Levine, Louis D. (1 January 1973), "Geographical Studies in the Neo-Assyrian Zagros: I", Iran, 11: 1–27, doi:10.2307/4300482, ISSN 0578-6967, JSTOR 4300482
- Levine, Louis D. (1 January 1974), "Geographical Studies in the Neo-Assyrian Zagros-II", Iran, 12: 99–124, doi:10.2307/4300506, ISSN 0578-6967, JSTOR 4300506
- Rawlinson, George (2007) [1885]. The Seven Great Monarchies of the Ancient Eastern World. Vol. 7. New York: John B. Eldan Press. ISBN 978-1-931956-46-8.
- Rollinger, Robert (2021). "The Median Dilemma". In Jacobs, Bruno; Rollinger, Robert (eds.). A Companion to the Achaemenid Persian Empire. John Wiley & Sons. pp. 457–473. ISBN 978-1119174288.
- Schmitt, Rüdiger (2008), "Old Persian", in Woodard, Roger D. (ed.), The Ancient Languages of Asia and the Americas, Cambridge University Press, pp. 76–100, ISBN 978-0-521-68494-1
- Soudavar, Abolala (2003), The aura of kings: legitimacy and divine sanction in Iranian kingship, Mazda Publishers, ISBN 978-1-56859-109-4
- Stierlin, Henri (2006). Splendeurs de I'Empire perse (in French). Paris: Grund. ISBN 978-2700015249.
- Stronach, David (1968), "Tepe Nush-i Jan: A Mound in Media", The Metropolitan Museum of Art Bulletin, New Series, 27 (3): 177–186, doi:10.2307/3258384, ISSN 0026-1521, JSTOR 3258384
- Stronach, David (1982), "Archeology ii. Median and Achaemenid", in Yarshater, E. (ed.), Encyclopædia Iranica, vol. 2, Routledge & Kegan Paul, pp. 288–296, ISBN 978-0-933273-67-2
- Tavernier, Jan (2007), Iranica in the Achaemenid Period (ca. 550-330 B.C.): Linguistic Study of Old Iranian Proper Names and Loanwords, Attested in Non-Iranian Texts, Peeters Publishers, ISBN 978-90-429-1833-7
- Van De Mieroop, Marc (2015), A History of the Ancient Near East, ca. 3000–323 BC, Wiley Blackwell
- Windfuhr, Gernot L. (1991), "Central dialects", in Yarshater, E. (ed.), Encyclopædia Iranica, Routledge & Kegan Paul, pp. 242–251, ISBN 978-0-939214-79-2
- Young, T. Cuyler Jr. (1988), "The early history of the Medes and the Persians and the Achaemenid empire to the death of Cambyses", in Boardman, John; Hammond, N. G. L.; Lewis, D. M.; Ostwald, M. (eds.), The Cambridge Ancient History, vol. 4, Cambridge University Press, pp. 1–52, doi:10.1017/CHOL9780521228046.002, ISBN 978-1139054317, archived from the original on 27 March 2012
- Young, T. Cuyler (1997), "Medes", in Meyers, Eric M. (ed.), The Oxford encyclopedia of archaeology in the Near East, vol. 3, Oxford University Press, pp. 448–450, ISBN 978-0-19-511217-7
- Zadok, Ran (2002), "The Ethno-Linguistic Character of Northwestern Iran and Kurdistan in the Neo-Assyrian Period", Iran, 40: 89–151, doi:10.2307/4300620, ISSN 0578-6967, JSTOR 4300620
- Kuz'mina, E. Efimovna (2007). Mallory, J. Patrick (ed.). The Origin of the Indo-Iranians. BRILL. ISBN 978-90-04-16054-5.
