= Phraortes =

King of the Medes from 675 to 653 BC

King of the Medes
- Reign: 675 – 653 BC
- Predecessor: Deioces
- Successor: Cyaxares
- Died: 653 BC
- Dynasty: Median
- Father: Deioces
- Religion: Ancient Iranian religion

Phraortes, (Note: /freɪˈɔːrtiz/ fray-OAR-teez; Old Persian: 𐎳𐎼𐎺𐎼𐎫𐎡𐏁, romanized: Fravartiš; Ancient Greek: Φραόρτης, romanized: Phraórtēs) son of Deioces, was the second king of the Median kingdom.

Like his father Deioces, Phraortes started wars against Assyria, but was defeated and killed by the Assyrian king, widely agreed to have been Ashurbanipal (r. 669-631 BC).

== Biography ==
All ancient information about him is from Herodotus. According to him (1.102), Phraortes was the son of Deioces and united all Median tribes into a single state. He also subjugated the Persians and Parthians and other nations of ancient Iran, before declaring war on the Assyrians and losing. He ruled for twenty-two years (c. 675 – c. 653 BC) before his death in battle with Assyria. Media was then ruled by Scythians, allies of Assyria, for 28 years before Phraortes's son, Cyaxeres, overthrew Scythian domination and became king in 625. Although the identification is not without skeptics, Phraortes is commonly identified with Kashtariti, a powerful Median chieftain who had invaded Assyria with the help of a confederacy of Median tribes and other allies. Kashtariti was referred to as "king of the Medes" by Esarhaddon around 678 BC, shortly after the death of Deioces.

== Book of Judith ==
Various scholars have identified Phraortes with the "Arphaxad, king of the Medes" in the Book of Judith. Fulcran Vigouroux identified the battle between "Nebuchadnezzar, king of the Assyrians" and "Arphaxad, the king of the Medes" as the battle that occurred between Ashurbanipal and Phraortes. This battle occurred during the seventeenth year of Ashurbanipal's reign, and the book of Judith states that this battle occurred in the seventeenth year of "Nebuchadnezzar's" reign. The book of Judith also relates that the Assyrians were abandoned by their allies before the war with "Arphaxad", which lines up with what Herodotus wrote about the war with Phraortes: "at that time they [the Assyrians] were left without support, their allies having revolted from them". Jacques-Bénigne Bossuet expressed a similar view regarding this. As argued by Vigouroux, the two battles mentioned in the Septuagint version of the Book of Judith are a reference to the clash of the two empires in 658–657 and to Phraortes' death in battle in 653, after which Ashurbanipal continued his military actions with a large campaign starting with the Battle of the Ulai River the same year. Jean-Baptiste Glaire wrote: "Arphaxad is probably the name, altered by copyists, of Phraortes or Aphraartes, successor of Deioces, king of the Medes, who is commonly said to have reigned from 690 to 655 BC. Nebuchadnezzar, king of Nineveh, is likely Ashurbanipal. ... Ashurbanipal recounts in his inscriptions that he defeated the Medes."
