= Avestan =

Liturgical language of Zoroastrianism originating in the Old Iranian period

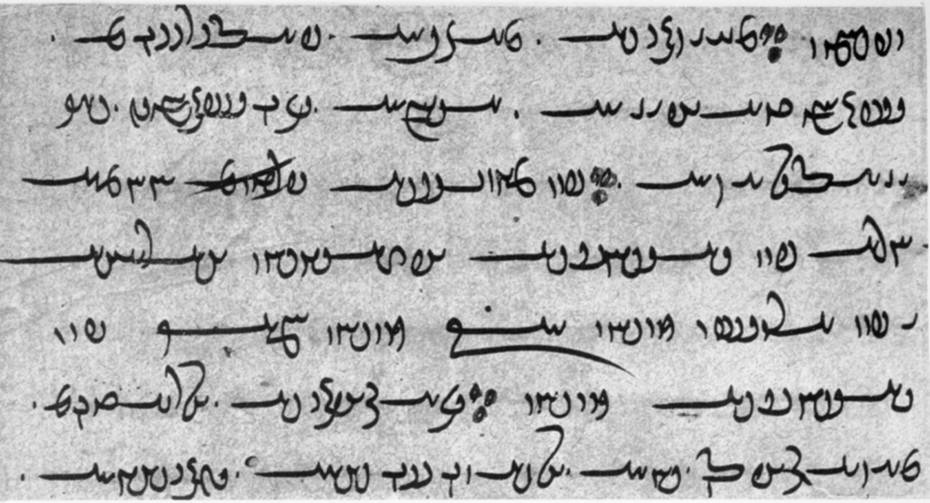
- Yasna 28.1, Ahunavaiti Gatha (Bodleian MS J2)
- Region: Central Asia
- Era: Late Bronze Age, Iron Age
- Language family: Indo-European: Indo-Iranian; Iranian; Avestan
- Early forms: Proto-Indo-European: Proto-Indo-Iranian; Proto-Iranian
- Writing system: Avestan alphabet; Gujarati script (used by Indian Zoroastrians)

Language codes
- ISO 639-1: ae
- ISO 639-2: ave
- ISO 639-3: ave
- Glottolog: aves1237
- Linguasphere: 58-ABA-a

Avestan (/əˈvɛstən/ ə-VESS-tən) is the liturgical language of Zoroastrianism. It belongs to the Iranian branch of the Indo-European language family and was originally spoken during the Avestan period (c. 1500 – c. 400 BCE) (Note: Scholarship dicusses a wide range of possibilities regarding the dating of Avestan. A discussion on this topic is provided below.) by the Iranians living in eastern Greater Iran as evidenced from names in Avestan geography.

After Avestan became extinct, its religious texts were transmitted orally, then collected and put into writing during the Sasanian period (c. 400 – c. 500 CE). The extant material falls into two groups: Old Avestan (c. 1500 – c. 900 BCE) and Younger Avestan (c. 900 – c. 400 BCE). The immediate ancestor of Old Avestan was the Proto-Iranian language, a sister language to the Proto-Indo-Aryan language, with both having developed from the earlier Proto-Indo-Iranian language. As such, Old Avestan is quite close in both grammar and lexicon to Vedic Sanskrit, the oldest preserved Indo-Aryan language.

== Name ==
The Avestan texts consistently use the term Arya, 'Aryan', for the speakers of Avestan. The same term also appears in ancient Persian and Greek sources as an umbrella term for Iranian languages. Despite this, the Avestan texts never use Arya, or any other term, specifically in reference to the language itself, and its native name therefore remains unknown.

The modern name Avestan is instead derived from Avesta, which is the name of the written collection of the Avestan texts. This collection was created during the Sasanian Empire period, to complement the up-to-then purely oral tradition. Like Vedic, Avestan is therefore a language which is named after the text corpus in which it is used and simply means language of the Avesta. The name Avesta comes from Persian اوستا (avestâ) itself derived from Middle Persian abestāg. It might originate from a hypothetical Avestan term *upastāvaka (praise song). The language was sometimes called Zend in older works, stemming from a misunderstanding of Zend (commentaries and interpretations of Zoroastrian scripture) as referring to the Avesta itself, due to both often being bundled together as Zend-Avesta.

== Classification ==
Avestan is usually grouped into two variants: Old Avestan, also known as Gathic Avestan, and Young Avestan. More recently, some scholars have argued for a third intermediate stage called Middle Avestan, but this is not yet universally followed. Old Avestan is much more archaic than Young Avestan, especially in terms of its morphology. It is assumed that the two are separated by several centuries. In addition, Old Avestan differs dialectally, i.e. it is not the direct predecessor of Young Avestan but a closely related dialect. Despite these differences, Old and Young Avestan are usually interpreted as two different variants of the same language instead of two different languages.

Avestan is an Old Iranian language and, together with Old Persian, one of the two languages from that period for which texts are available. Other known Old Iranian languages, like Median and early Scythian, are only known from isolated words and personal names. Young Avestan shows morphological and syntactical similarities with Old Persian, which may indicate that both were spoken around the same time. On the other hand, Old Avestan is substantially more archaic than either of these and largely agrees morphologically with Vedic Sanskrit, i.e., the oldest known Indo-Aryan language. This suggests that only a limited period of time has elapsed since the two separated from their common Indo-Iranian ancestor.

Scholars traditionally classify Iranian languages as Eastern or Western according to certain grammatical features, and within this framework Avestan is sometimes classified as Eastern Old Iranian. However, as for instance Sims-Williams and Schmitt have pointed out, the east–west distinction is of limited meaning for Avestan, as the linguistic developments that later distinguish Eastern from Western Iranian had not yet occurred. Due to some shared developments with Median, Scholars like Skjaervo and Windfuhr have classified Avestan as a Central Iranian language.

== History ==
=== Avestan as a native language ===
The Avestan language is only known from the Avesta and is otherwise unattested. As a result, there is no external evidence on which to base the time frame during which the Avestan language was natively spoken and all attempts have to rely on internal evidence. Such attempts were often linked to the life of Zarathustra, being the central figure of Zoroastrianism. Zarathustra was traditionally based in the 6th century BCE meaning that Old Avestan would have been spoken during the early Achaemenid period. Given that a substantial time must have passed between Old Avestan and Young Avestan, the latter would have been spoken somewhere during the Hellenistic or the Parthian period of Iranian history.

However, more recent scholarship has increasingly shifted to an earlier dating. The literature presents a number of reasons for this shift, based on both the Old Avestan and the Young Avestan material. As regards Old Avestan, the Gathas show strong linguistic and cultural similarities with the Rigveda, which in turn is assumed to represent the second half of the second millennium BCE. As regards Young Avestan, texts like the Yashts and the Vendidad are situated in the eastern parts of Greater Iran and lack any discernible Persian or Median influence from Western Iran. This is interpreted such that the bulk of this material, which has been produced several centuries after Zarathustra, must still predate the sixth century BCE. As a result, more recent scholarship often assumes that the major parts of the Young Avestan texts mainly reflect the first half of the first millennium BCE, whereas the Old Avestan texts of Zarathustra may have been composed around 1000 BCE or even as early as 1500 BCE.

It is not known at what point Avestan ceased to be a spoken language. Even the Young Avestan texts are still quite archaic and show no signs of evolving into a hypothetical Middle Iranian stage of development. In addition, none of the known Middle Iranian languages are the successor of Avestan. The Zend, i.e., the Middle Persian commentaries of the Avesta show that Avestan was no longer fully understood by the Zoroastrian commentators, indicating that it was no longer a living language by the late Sasanian period. It has been suggested that the ancestor of Pashto was close to Old Avestan.

=== Geographical distribution ===
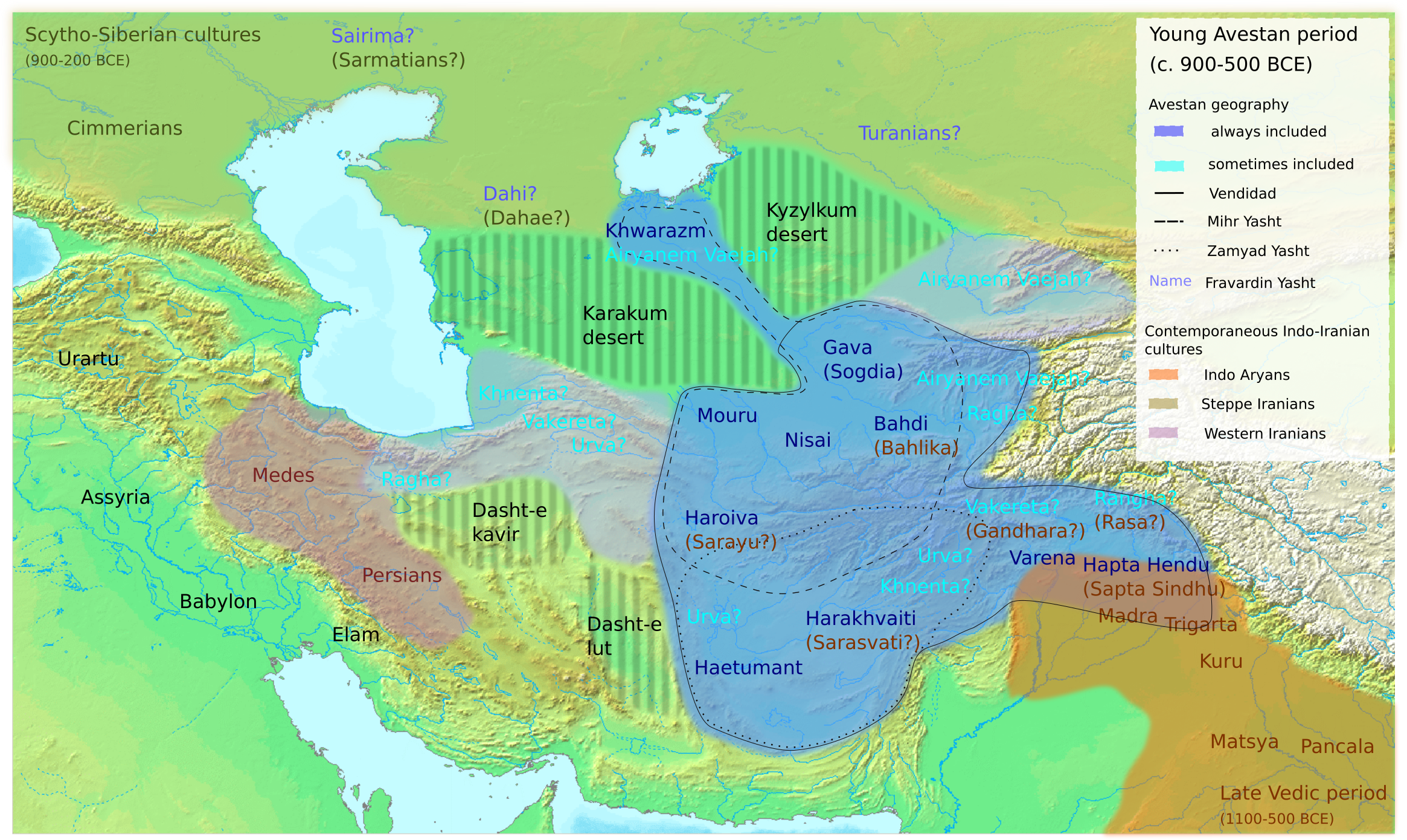
Geographical distribution of the place names mentioned in the Avesta

There are no historical sources that connect Avestan or its native speakers with any specific region. In addition, the Old Avestan texts do not mention any place names that can be identified. On the other hand, the Younger Avestan texts contain a substantial number of geographical references that are known from later sources and therefore allow to delineate the geographical horizon that was known and important to the speakers of Younger Avestan. It is nowadays widely accepted that these place names are situated in the eastern parts of Greater Iran corresponding to the entirety of present-day Afghanistan and Tajikistan as well as parts of Turkmenistan, Uzbekistan, and Pakistan. Avestan is therefore assumed to have been spoken somewhere within this large region, although its precise location cannot be further specified.

Due to this geographical uncertainty, as well as the lack of any dateable historical events within the texts themselves, linking any given archeological culture with the speakers of Avestan has remained difficult. Among possible candidates, the Yaz culture has been named as likely. This is due to the fact that it is connected with the southward spread of steppe-derived Iranic groups, the presence of farming practices consistent with the Young Avestan society and the lack of burial sites, indicating the Zoroastrian practice of open air excarnation.

=== Avestan as a liturgical language ===
Both Old and Young Avestan texts are assumed to have been composed by their respective native speakers and were possibly updated and revised for an extended period of time. At two different times, however, they became fixed, purely liturgical, languages and were transmitted by rote learning. Scholars like Kellens, Skjærvø and Hoffman have identified a number of distinct stages of this transmission and how they changed the Avestan during its use as the sacred language of Zoroastrianism.

In the first stage, Old Avestan would have become the liturgical language of the early Zoroastrian community as described in the Young Avestan texts. Karl Hoffmann for instance identifies changes introduced due to slow chanting, the insertion of Young Avestan phonetic features into the material, attempts at standardizations as well as other editorial changes. The Young Avestan texts, however, were still produced, recomposed, and handed down during this time in a fluid oral tradition.

In the next stage, the Young Avestan texts crystallized as well meaning that both the Young and Old Avestan texts became the fixed, liturgical literature of non-Avestan Zoroastrian communities. The transmission of this literature largely took place in Western Iran as evidenced by alterations introduced by native Persian speakers. In addition, different scholars have tried to identify other dialects that may have impacted the pronunciation of certain Avestan features during the transmission, possibly before they reached Persia. Some Young Avestan texts, like the Vendidad, show ungrammatical features and may have been partly recomposed by non-Avestan speakers.

The purely oral transmission came to an end during the 5th or 6th century CE, when the Avestan corpus was committed to written form. This was achieved through the creation of the Avestan alphabet resulting in the Sasanian Avesta. Despite this, the post Sasanian written transmission saw a further deterioration of the Avestan texts. A large portion of the literature was lost after the 10th century CE and the surviving texts show signs of incorrect pronunciations and copying errors.

Many phonetic features cannot be ascribed with certainty to a particular stage since there may be more than one possibility. Every phonetic form that can be ascribed to the Sasanian archetype on the basis of critical assessment of the manuscript evidence must have gone through the stages mentioned above so that "Old Avestan" and "Young Avestan" really mean no more than "Old Avestan and Young Avestan of the Sasanian period".

== Alphabet ==
Mazdayasnā written in the Avestan alphabet

The script used for writing Avestan developed during the 3rd or 4th century CE. By then the language had been extinct for many centuries, and remained in use only as a liturgical language of the Avesta canon. As is still the case today, the liturgies were memorized by the priesthood and recited by rote.

The script devised to render Avestan was natively known as Din dabireh "religion writing". It has 53 distinct characters and is written right-to-left. Among the 53 characters are about 30 letters that are – through the addition of various loops and flourishes – variations of the 13 graphemes of the cursive Pahlavi script (i.e. Book Pahlavi) that is known from the post-Sasanian texts of Zoroastrian tradition. These symbols, like those of all the Pahlavi scripts, are in turn based on Aramaic script symbols. Avestan also incorporates several letters from other writing systems, most notably the vowels, which are mostly derived from Greek minuscules. A few letters were free inventions, as were also the symbols used for punctuation. Also, the Avestan alphabet has one letter that has no corresponding sound in the Avestan language; the character for /l/ (a sound that Avestan does not have) was added to write Pazend texts.

The Avestan script is alphabetic, and the large number of letters suggests that its design was due to the need to render the orally recited texts with high phonetic precision. The correct enunciation of the liturgies was (and still is) considered necessary for the prayers to be effective.

The Zoroastrians of India, who represent one of the largest surviving Zoroastrian communities worldwide, also transcribe Avestan in Brahmi-based scripts. This is a relatively recent development first seen in the c. 12th century texts of Neryosang Dhaval and other Parsi Sanskritist theologians of that era, which are roughly contemporary with the oldest surviving manuscripts in Avestan script. Today, Avestan is most commonly typeset in the Gujarati script (Gujarati being the traditional language of the Indian Zoroastrians). Some Avestan letters with no corresponding symbol are synthesized with additional diacritical marks, for example, the /z/ in zaraθuštra is written with j with a dot below.

== Phonology ==
Avestan has retained voiced sibilants, and has fricative rather than aspirate series. There are various conventions for transliteration of the Avestan alphabet, the one adopted for this article being:

Vowels:

a ā ə ə̄ e ē o ō å ą i ī u ū

Consonants:

k g γ x xʷ č ǰ t d δ θ t̰ p b β f
ŋ ŋʷ ṇ ń n m y w r s z š ṣ̌ ž h

The glides y and w are often transcribed as <ii> and <uu>, when not word-initial. The letter transcribed <t̰> indicates an allophone of /t/ with no audible release, i.e. [t̚], at the end of a word and before certain obstruents.

=== Consonants ===
		Labial	Dental	Alveolar	Post-alveolar	Retroflex	Palatal or alveolo-palatal	Velar	Labiovelar	Glottal
Nasal		⟨m⟩ /m/	⟨n⟩ /n/				⟨ń⟩ /ɲ/	⟨ŋ⟩ /ŋ/	⟨ŋʷ⟩ /ŋʷ/	
Plosive	voiceless	⟨p⟩ /p/	⟨t⟩ /t/		⟨č⟩ /tʃ/			⟨k⟩ /k/		
Plosive	voiced	⟨b⟩ /b/	⟨d⟩ /d/		⟨ǰ⟩ /dʒ/			⟨g⟩ /ɡ/		
Fricative	voiceless	⟨f⟩ /ɸ/	⟨θ⟩ /θ/	⟨s⟩ /s/	⟨š⟩ /ʃ/	⟨ṣ̌⟩ /ʂ/	⟨š́⟩ /ɕ/	⟨x⟩ /x/	⟨xʷ⟩ /xʷ/	⟨h⟩ /h/
Fricative	voiced	⟨β⟩ /β/	⟨δ⟩ /ð/	⟨z⟩ /z/	⟨ž⟩ /ʒ/			⟨γ⟩ /ɣ/		
Approximant							⟨y⟩ /j/		⟨v⟩ /w/	
Trill				⟨r⟩ /r/						

According to Beekes, [ð] and [ɣ] are allophones of /θ/ and /x/ respectively (in Old Avestan).

=== Vowels ===
	Front		Central		Back	
	short	long	short	long	short	long
Close	i ⟨i⟩	iː ⟨ī⟩			u ⟨u⟩	uː ⟨ū⟩
Mid	e ⟨e⟩	eː ⟨ē⟩	ə ⟨ə⟩	əː ⟨ə̄⟩	o ⟨o⟩	oː ⟨ō⟩
Open			a ⟨a⟩	aː ⟨ā⟩	ɒ ⟨å⟩	ɒː ⟨ā̊⟩
Nasal			ã ⟨ą̇⟩	ãː ⟨ą⟩		

== Grammar ==
=== Nouns ===
Case	"normal" endings			a-stems: (masc. neut.)		
Case	Singular	Dual	Plural	Singular	Dual	Plural
Nominative	-s	-ā	-ō (-as), -ā	-ō (yasn-ō)	-a (vīr-a)	-a (-yasna)
Vocative	–	-ā	-ō (-as), -ā	-a (ahur-a)	-a (vīr-a)	-a (yasn-a), -ånghō
Accusative	-əm	-ā	-ō (-as, -ns), -ā	-əm (ahur-əm)	-a (vīr-a)	-ą (haom-ą)
Instrumental	-ā	-byā	-bīš	-a (ahur-a)	-aēibya (vīr-aēibya)	-āiš (yasn-āiš)
Dative	-ē	-byā	-byō (-byas)	-āi (ahur-āi)	-aēibya (vīr-aēibya)	-aēibyō (yasn-aēibyō)
Ablative	-at	-byā	-byō	-āt (yasn-āt)	-aēibya (vīr-aēibya)	-aēibyō (yasn-aēibyō)
Genitive	-ō (-as)	-å	-ąm	-ahe (ahur-ahe)	-ayå (vīr-ayå)	-anąm (yasn-anąm)
Locative	-i	-ō, -yō	-su, -hu, -šva	-e (yesn-e)	-ayō (zast-ayō)	-aēšu (vīr-aēšu), -aēšva

=== Verbs ===
Primary active endings
Person	Singular	Dual	Plural
1st	-mi	-vahi	-mahi
2nd	-hi	-tha	-tha
3rd	-ti	-tō, -thō	-ṇti

== Sample text ==
Latin alphabet	Avestan alphabet	English Translation
ahyā. yāsā. nəmaŋhā. ustānazastō. rafəδrahyā.manyə̄uš. mazdā. pourwīm. spəṇtahyā. aṣ̌ā. vīspə̄ṇg. š́yaoθanā.vaŋhə̄uš. xratūm. manaŋhō. yā. xṣ̌nəwīṣ̌ā. gə̄ušcā. urwānəm.::		With outspread hands in petition for that help, O Mazda, I will pray for the works of the holy spirit, O thou the Right, whereby I may please the will of Good Thought and the Ox-Soul.

== Example phrases ==
The following phrases were phonetically transcribed from Avestan:

Avestan	English	Comment
tapaiti	It's hot	Can also mean "he is hot" or "she is hot" (in temperature)
šyawaθa	You move	
vō vatāmi	I understand you	
mā vātayaθa	You teach me	Literally: "You let me understand"
dim nayehi	Thou leadest him/her	
dim vō nāyayeiti	He/she lets you lead him/her	Present tense
mā barahi	Thou carryest me	
nō baraiti	He/she carries us	
θβā dim bārayāmahi	We let him/her carry thee	Present tense
drawāmahi	We run	
dīš drāwayāmahi	We let them run	Present tense
θβā hacāmi	I follow thee	
dīš hācayeinti	They accompany them	Literally: "They let them follow"
ramaiti	He rests	
θβā rāmayemi	I calm thee	Literally: "I let thee rest"

== See also ==
- Proto-Indo-European language
- Proto-Indo-Iranian language
- Vedic Sanskrit
