= Gernot Ludwig Windfuhr =

- Born: August 2, 1938 (age 88); Essen, Germany

Academic background
- Education: University of Hamburg (PhD)

Academic work
- Discipline: Near Eastern studies
- Sub-discipline: Iranian linguistics; Iranian literature; Iranian religion
- Institutions: University of Michigan

Gernot Ludwig Windfuhr (born 2 August 1938 in Essen) is a retired professor from the University of Michigan, where he taught in the Department of Near Eastern Studies. He graduated from the Cologne Center of Language Sciences at the University of Cologne in 1962, in Iranian studies from the University of Tehran in 1961, and in Islamic studies, Iranian studies, and linguistics from the University of Hamburg in 1965.

== Career ==
In 1967, Windfuhr joined the faculty of the Department of Near Eastern Studies at the University of Michigan as an assistant professor, after a year there as a visiting professor. He was promoted to associate professor in 1969, and became a full professor in 1973. From 1977 to 1987, he served as the head of the department, whereupon he was made professor emeritus.

== Editorial boards ==
- Consulting editor for linguistics – Encyclopædia Iranica
- Editor – International Journal of Ancient Iranian Studies
- Editor – Iranian Journal of Language Studies
- Board of Consultants – Iranistik. Deutschsprachige Zeitschrift für iranistische Studien

== Books ==
- Aghaei & Ghanoonparvar, Behrad & M. R. (2012). Iranian Languages and Culture: Essays in Honor of Gernot Ludwig Windfuhr. Mazda Publishers. p. 225. ISBN 978-1568592848.
- Windfuhr, Gernot (1965). Verbalmorpheme im Sangesari: ein Beitrag zur neuiranischen Dialektkunde (PhD). University of Hamburg.
- Windfuhr, Gernot; Bostanbakhsh, Shapour (1980). Modern Persian, Intermediate Level, Volume 1. Department of Near Eastern Studies, University of Michigan. p. 332.
