= Tynna =

Ancient Anatolian city in Cataonia

- Porsuk Höyük; Zeyve Höyük
- Tunna
- Location within Turkey
- 37.5144°N 34.5794°E
- Location: Turkey
- Region: Niğde Province

Tynna (Ancient Greek: Τύννα, romanized: Túnna; Latin: Tynna) was an ancient Anatolian city located at the foothills of the Taurus Mountains, near the town of Ulukışla and the Cilician Gates in southern Cappadocia.

It is known in the present-day as Porsuk Höyük or Zeyve Höyük in Asiatic Turkey.

== Name ==
The name of the city was Tunna or Dunna (Hittite: 𒌷𒁺𒌦𒈾) during the Hittite Empire.

In Classical Antiquity, the city was known as Tynna (Ancient Greek: Τύννα, romanized: Túnna; Latin: Tynna).

== History ==
=== Bronze Age ===
Tunna might have been founded during the Hittite Old Kingdom by the sons of the king Ḫattušili I, some time during the late Middle and early Late Bronze Age.

Beginning with the reign of the Hittite king Šuppiluliuma I, Tunna was referred to in state treaties of the Hittite Empire as the cult site of the goddess Ḫallara, who headed the local pantheon.

According to the Bronze Tablet and the Ulmi-Teššub Treaty, Tunna was a location in the region of Tarḫuntašša in the Ḫūlaya River Land where the hypostasis of the storm god Tarḫuntaš bearing the epithet of piḫaššaššiš (𒁉𒄩𒀸𒊭𒀸𒅆𒅖) was venerated, with piḫaššaššiš Tarḫuntaš (𒀭𒌋𒁉𒄩𒀸𒊭𒀸𒅆𒅖) possibly meaning lit. 'Tarḫuntaš of Lightning'.

Tunna was mentioned alongside Ḫupišna and Zallara in a Hittite local deity list, and a Chief of the Cooks was responsible for the cult inventory of the country of Tunna.

The Hittite magician Tunnawi or Tunnawiya might have been a native of Tunna, as suggested by the meaning of her name, meaning lit. 'Woman from Tunna' or lit. 'the mountain-god Tunna has sent her'. Tunnawi appears to have lived in the early 14th century BC, and she was the author of a ritual against impurity, a taknaz da ritual for the royal couple, a birth ritual, and a ritual of the cattle.

Due to its strategic location at the Cilician Gates, Tunna was located on one of the main routes which in ancient times connected the Anatolian Plateau to the Syro-Mesopotamian region.

Tunna (?)
- Common languages: Luwian
- Religion: Luwian religion
- King
  - 8th century BC: Tarḫunazzas
  - Unknown: Masauraḫisas (?)

Vassal of Tuwana
- Historical era: Iron Age
Preceded by
Hittite empire
- Today part of: Turkey

=== Iron Age ===
==== Identification ====
===== Atuna =====
Although Tunna has been suggested as a possible location for the capital of the kingdom of Atuna, this latter kingdom was instead likely located further north, in northern Cappadocia.

Since Atuna later obtained the territory of the Tabalian kingdom of Šinuḫtu, it was likely in the region immediately south of the Halys river's southernmost bend, to the immediate north of Šinuḫtu, and to the west of the kingdom of Tabal proper and around the site which the present-day village of Bohça, which was possibly its capital and where the king Kurtî of Atuna had erected a stele.

Phonetically, the name Tunna could not represent a variant of a possible form *Atunna, since the initial /a/ did not disappear in the Luwian language, which also suggests against identifying Tunna with Atuna.

===== Tunnas =====
The country around Tunna might have corresponded to the lands of Upper Tunnas (Hieroglyphic Luwian: 𔑏𔖱𔗔𔑢𔐤𔗔, romanized: sarras Tunnas) and Lower Tunnas (Hieroglyphic Luwian: 𔐓𔐤𔖹𔗦𔗷𔑢𔐤𔗦𔔂, romanized: annantarris Tunnas) referred to in an economic inventory from the kingdom of Tabal proper recording the transfer of goods.

==== History ====
In the 9th century BC, Tunna was destroyed during the campaign of the Neo-Assyrian king Shalmaneser III in the Tabalian region in 837 BC.

The "silver mountain," Tunni, visited by Shalmaneser III during this campaign might have been identical with the site of Tunna, and the country of Tunna might also have been identical with the country of Tuna mentioned in lead strips from the kingdom of Tabal proper, although this identification is still uncertain.

During the 8th century BC, Tunna was a Tabalian petty city-state ruled by a king named Tarḫunazzas, who was himself a vassal of the king Warpalawas II of Tuwana. In an inscription at the site corresponding to present-day Bulgarmaden, Tarḫunazzas recorded that, in exchange for his services, his overlord Warpalawas II had offered to him the Mount Mudis.

Mount Mudis was a rocky outcrop of the Taurus Mountains near the Cilician Gates, and was likely identical with the "alabaster mountain," Mount Mulî, which the Neo-Assyrian king Shalmaneser III climbed and from where he extracted alabaster during his campaign in the Tabalian region in 837 BCE. The name Mulî (𒆳𒈬𒇷𒄿) was the Akkadian form of a Luwian original name Mudis (𔑿𔑣𔗔) which had experienced the Luwian sound shift from /d/ to /l/.

Based on the close association of Mount Tunni with Mount Mulî in the Neo-Assyrian records, both of these mountains were located close to each other, in the northeastern end of the Bolkar and Taurus Mountains, where are presently located the silver mines of Bulgarmaden and the gypsum mine at Porsuk-Zeyve Höyük.

New defensive structures were built at Tunna during the reign of Warpalawas II.

Another petty-king of Tunna who was vassal of the kings of Tuwana might have been Masauraḫissas, who possibly reigned in the middle or late 8th century BC, and who is known from an inscription by his general Parḫwiras. Masauraḫissas's name might possibly have been a Luwianisation of a Phrygian name Masa Urgitos.

==== List of rulers ====
- Tarḫunazzas (Hieroglyphic Luwian: 𔓢𔕙𔐤𔐔𔖪𔗦𔗷), r. 8th century BC
- Masauraḫissas ? (Hieroglyphic Luwian: 𔒅𔗔𔖙𔖱𔗒𔑷𔗦), r. unknown

=== Classical Antiquity ===
During the Hellenistic period, Tunna became known as Tynna (Ancient Greek: Τύννα, romanized: Túnna; Latin: Tynna), and was mentioned by Ptolemy.

Tynna was located in the neighbourhood of Faustinopolis, and remained inhabited through Roman times.

== Sources ==
- Adiego, Ignasi-Xavier (2019). "The Survival of the God Name Šarruma in Cilician Names in the Greek Sources". Altorientalische Forschungen [Ancient Near Eastern Research]. 46 (2). Walter de Gruyter: 147–160. doi:10.1515/aofo-2019-0010.
- Aro, Sanna (2013). "Tabal". In Streck, Michael P. [in German]; Frantz-Szabó, Gabriella; Krebernik, Manfred [in German]; Bonacossi, D. Morandi; Postgate, J. N.; Seidl, Ursula [in German]; Stol, M.; Wilhelm, Gernot [in German] (eds.). Reallexikon der Assyriologie und Vorderasiatischen Archäologie [Encyclopaedia of Ancient Near Eastern Studies] (in German). Vol. 13. Berlin, Germany; New York City, United States: Walter de Gruyter. pp. 388–391. ISBN 978-3-110-30715-3.
- Barat, Claire; Köker Gökçe, Emine; Pichonneau, Jean-François; Sadozaï, Chamsia (2022). "Porsuk – Zeyve Höyük: Rapport préliminaire de la campagne 2021" [Porsuk – Zeyve Höyük: Preliminary Report of the 2021 Campaign]. Anatolia Antiqua = Eski Anadolu. 30: 67–81.
- Beyer, Dominique (2012). "Zeyve höyük-Porsuk. Bilan des recherches sur les niveaux du Bronze et du Fer" [Zeyve höyük-Porsuk: Review of Research on the Bronze and Iron Age Levals]. Archéologies et espaces parcourus [Archeologies and Scoured Spaces]. Rencontres d'Archéologie de l'IFEA. Vol. 1. Istanbul, Turkey: Institut français d'études anatoliennes. pp. 45–56. ISBN 978-2-362-45006-8.
- Bryce, Trevor (2009). The Routledge Handbook of the Peoples and Places of Ancient Western Asia: From the Early Bronze Age to the Fall of the Persian Empire. London, United Kingdom: Routledge. ISBN 978-0-415-39485-7.
- Bryce, Trevor (2012). The World of The Neo-Hittite Kingdoms: A Political and Military History. Oxford, United Kingdom: Oxford University Press. ISBN 978-0-199-21872-1.
- D'Alfonso, Lorenzo (2012). "Tabal, an 'out-group' definition in the first Millennium BCE". In Lanfranchi, Giovanni B.; Bonacossi, Daniele Morandi; Pappi, Cinzia; Ponchia, Simonetta [in German] (eds.). Leggo! Studies Presented to Frederick Mario Fales on the Occasion of His 65ᵗʰ Birthday. Wiesbaden, Germany: Harrassowitz Verlag. pp. 173–194. ISBN 978-3-447-06659-4.
- Hawkins, J. D. [in German] (1997). "Muli". In Edzard, Dietz Otto; Calmeyer, P.; Postgate, J. N.; Röllig, W. [in German]; von Soden, W.; Stol, M.; Wilhelm, G.; Frantz-Szabó, Gabriella (eds.). Reallexikon der Assyriologie und vorderasiatischen Archäologie [Encyclopaedia of Ancient Near Eastern Studies]. Vol. 8. Berlin, Germany; New York City, United States: Walter de Gruyter. p. 414. ISBN 978-3-110-14809-1.
- Hawkins, John D. [in German] (2000). Inscriptions of the Iron Age. Part 1: Text, Introduction, Karatepe, Karkamiš, Tell Ahmar, Maraş, Malatya, Commagene. Corpus of Hieroglyphic Luwian Inscriptions. Berlin, Germany: Walter de Gruyter. ISBN 978-3-110-10864-4.
- Hawkins, John David [in German] (2000b). Inscriptions of the Iron Age, Part 2: Text: Amuq, Aleppo, Hama, Tabal, Assur Letters, Miscellaneous, Seals, Indices. Corpus of Hieroglyphic Luwian Inscriptions. Vol. 1. Berlin, Germany; New York City, United States: Walter de Gruyter. ISBN 978-3-110-10864-4.
- Hawkins, John David [in German] (2000c). Inscriptions of the Iron Age, Part 3: Plates. Corpus of Hieroglyphic Luwian Inscriptions. Vol. 1. Berlin, Germany; New York City, United States: Walter de Gruyter. ISBN 978-3-110-10864-4.
- Gwendolyn Leick: Who's Who in the Ancient Near East. Routledge, London 1999, 2002. ISBN 978-0-415-13231-2
- Christian Marek, Peter Frei: Geschichte Kleinasiens in der Antike. Verlag C.H.Beck, Munich 2010. ISBN 978-3-406-59853-1
- Annick Payne: Iron Age Hieroglyphic Luwian Inscriptions. Society of Biblical Literature, Atlanta 2012. ISBN 978-1-58983-269-5
- Hutter, M. (2014). "Tunnawi". In Streck, Michael P. [in German]; Frantz-Szabó, Gabriella; Krebernik, Manfred [in German]; Bonacossi, D. Morandi; Postgate, J. N.; Seidl, Ursula [in German]; Stol, M.; Wilhelm, Gernot [in German] (eds.). Reallexikon der Assyriologie und Vorderasiatischen Archäologie [Encyclopaedia of Ancient Near Eastern Studies]. Vol. 14. Berlin, Germany; New York City, United States: Walter de Gruyter. p. 189. ISBN 978-3-110-41761-6.
- Prechel, D. [in German] (2016). "Tunna". In Streck, Michael P. [in German]; Frantz-Szabó, Gabriella; Krebernik, Manfred [in German]; Bonacossi, D. Morandi; Postgate, J. N.; Seidl, Ursula [in German]; Stol, M.; Wilhelm, Gernot [in German] (eds.). Reallexikon der Assyriologie und Vorderasiatischen Archäologie [Encyclopaedia of Ancient Near Eastern Studies] (in German). Vol. 14. Berlin, Germany; New York City, United States: Walter de Gruyter. pp. 188–189. ISBN 978-3-110-41761-6.
- Simon, Zsolt (2013). "Überlegungen zu Masaurhisas, einem König aus Tabal, und der Herrscherliste von Tuwana" [Reflections on Masaurhisas, a king from Tabal, and the king-list of Tuwana]. Anatolica. 39: 277–296. doi:10.2143/ANA.39.0.2990791.
- Singer, I. (2005). "Piḫaššaš(š)i-". In Edzard, Dietz Otto; Streck, Michael P. [in German]; Krebernik, Manfred [in German]; Postgate, J. N.; Seidl, Ursula [in German]; Stol, M.; Wilhelm, Gernot [in German]; Frantz-Szabó, Gabriella; Hellwag, Ursula (eds.). Reallexikon der Assyriologie und Vorderasiatischen Archäologie [Encyclopaedia of Ancient Near Eastern Studies]. Vol. 10. Berlin, Germany; New York City, United States: Walter de Gruyter. pp. 559–561. ISBN 978-3-110-18535-5.
- Streck, M.P. [in German] (2014). "Tunni". In Streck, Michael P. [in German]; Frantz-Szabó, Gabriella; Krebernik, Manfred [in German]; Bonacossi, D. Morandi; Postgate, J. N.; Seidl, Ursula [in German]; Stol, M.; Wilhelm, Gernot [in German] (eds.). Reallexikon der Assyriologie und Vorderasiatischen Archäologie [Encyclopaedia of Ancient Near Eastern Studies]. Vol. 14. Berlin, Germany; New York City, United States: Walter de Gruyter. pp. 189–190. ISBN 978-3-110-41761-6.
- Summers, Geoffrey D. (2023). "Resizing Phrygia: Migration, State and Kingdom". Altorientalische Forschungen [Ancient Near Eastern Research]. 50 (1). Walter de Gruyter: 107–128. doi:10.1515/aofo-2023-0009.
- Taracha, Piotr [in German] (2009). Religions of Second Millennium Anatolia. Dresdner Beiträge Zur Hethitologie. Vol. 27. Wiesbaden, Germany: Harrassowitz Verlag. ISBN 978-3-447-05885-8.
- Weeden, Mark (2010). "Tuwati and Wasusarma: Imitating the Behaviour of Assyria". Iraq. 72. British Institute for the Study of Iraq: 39–61. doi:10.1017/S0021088900000589.
- Weeden, Mark (2017). "Tabal and the Limits of Assyrian Imperialism". In Heffron, Yağmur; Stone, Adam; Worthington, Martin (eds.). At the Dawn of History: Ancient Near Eastern Studies in Honour of J. N. Postgate. Vol. 2. Winona, United States: Eisenbrauns. pp. 721–736. ISBN 978-1-57506-471-0.
- Weeden, Mark (2023). "The Iron Age States of Central Anatolia and Northern Syria". In Radner, Karen; Moeller, Nadine; Potts, Daniel T. (eds.). The Age of Assyria. The Oxford History of the Ancient Near East. Vol. 4. New York City, United States: Oxford University Press. pp. 912–1026. ISBN 978-0-190-68763-2.
