= Tabal (state) =

Neo-Hittite state

𒆳𒋫𒁄/𒌷𒋫𒁄 (Tabal: earlier) 𒆳𒂍𒁹𒁍𒊒𒋫𒀾 (Bīt-Burutaš: later)
- Early 1st millennium BC–713 BC
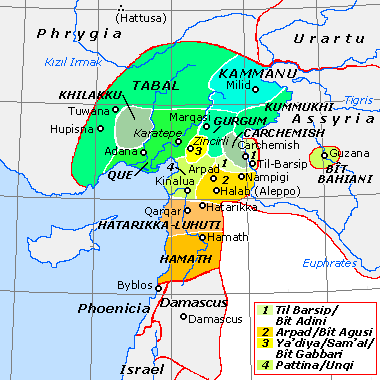
- Tabal among the Neo-Hittite states
- Capital: Artulu
- Common languages: Luwian
- Religion: Luwian religion
- Government: Monarchy
- Great King (earlier) King (later)
  - r. unknown – c. 837 BC: Tuwattis I
  - r. c. 837 BC – unknown: Kikki
  - r. c. mid 8th century BC: Tuwattis II
  - r. c. 740 BC – 730 BC: Wasusarmas
  - r. 730 BC – c. 726 BC, c. 721 BC: Ḫullî
  - r. c. 721 BC – 713 BC: Ambaris

Vassal of the Neo-Assyrian Empire (c. 740s - 713 BC)
- Historical era: Iron Age
  - Established: Early 1st millennium BC
  - Tabalian campaign of Shalmaneser III: 837 BC
  - Submission to the Neo-Assyrian Empire: c. 740 BC
  - War against Prizuwanda: mid-8th century BC
  - Deposition of Wasusarmas: c. 730 BC
  - Deposition of Ḫullî: c. 726 BC
  - Restoration of Ḫullî: c. 721 BC
  - Reorganisation into Bīt-Burutaš: c. 718 BC
  - Annexation by the Neo-Assyrian Empire: 713 BC
Preceded by	Succeeded by
Hittite Empire	Neo-Assyrian Empire
- Today part of: Turkey

Tabal (Neo-Assyrian Akkadian: 𒆳𒋫𒁄 and 𒌷𒋫𒁄), later reorganised into Bīt-Burutaš (Neo-Assyrian Akkadian: 𒆳𒂍𒁹𒁍𒊒𒋫𒀾) or Bīt-Paruta (Neo-Assyrian Akkadian: 𒂍𒁹𒉺𒊒𒋫), was a Luwian-speaking Neo-Hittite state which existed in southeastern Anatolia in the Iron Age.

== Name ==
The name Tabal given to the kingdom by the Neo-Assyrian Empire was likely an Akkadian term meaning "bank" or "shore" of a body of water, in reference to the kingdom and region of Tabal being on the southern bank of the Halys river.

Due to an absence of relevant Luwian inscriptions, the native name of the kingdom of Tabal is still unknown.

=== Usage ===
The kingdom of Tabal was located in a region bounded by the Halys river, the Taurus Mountains, the Konya Plain and the Anti-Taurus Mountains, and which was occupied by a cluster of Neo-Hittite states.

The Neo-Assyrian Empire used the name of Tabal in a narrow sense to refer to the kingdom of Tabal and in a broader sense to designate both this larger region of which the kingdom was part of and to the other states within this region collectively.

Modern scholarship therefore designates the kingdom as "Tabal proper" to distinguish it from the broader region of Tabal.

== Geography ==
=== Location ===
The kingdom of Tabal was one of the several states located in the larger region of Tabal, and was the northernmost and largest of them: the territory of Tabal proper was bounded to the north by the Halys river and it covered the areas surrounding what is presently the city of Kayseri in the modern Turkish provinces of Kayseri, Nevşehir, and Niğde until as far south as the region corresponding to present-day Aksaray. To the west, Tabal reached Lake Tatta, while it bordered Malizi in the east.

Some inscriptions referencing its king Tuwattis II nevertheless suggest that the kingdom of Tabal might have had some control in the areas to the north of the Halys river as well.

=== Settlements ===
The capital of Tabal, Artulu, has still not been discovered, although it might have been located at the site of present-day Kululu in Turkey, and another city belonging to this state was discovered at Sultanhan, itself in the western whereabouts of Kululu.

=== Neighbours ===
The most important neighbour of Tabal in the 8th century BCE was the kingdom of Tuwana, which was located immediately to the north of the entrance to the Taurus mountains. The southern border of Tabal was formed by the Erdaş and Hodul mountains, which separated it from Tuwana.

== History ==
A possible but uncertain early reference to Tabal from the Late Bronze Age might have been the "Land of Tuali" (Middle Assyrian Akkadian: 𒆳𒌅𒀀𒇷, romanized: māt Tuali) whose king was member of a coalition of 23 rulers whom the Middle Assyrian king Tiglath-pileser I defeated during his first campaign in Nairi. The name Tuali might have been an Akkadian form of a Luwian original name Tuwattis which had experienced the Luwian sound shift from /t/ to /l/. The name Tuali/Tuwattis appears to have belonged to an ancestral king of the kingdom, whose name was then reused by the later kings of this state.

Another possible but uncertain reference to Tabal might have been the prince Tuwattis whose image was carved in the Lion Gate of Malatya.

=== Tabalian campaign of Shalmaneser III ===
The first certain mention of Tabal proper is from the records of the Neo-Assyrian king Shalmaneser III's (r. 859 – 824 BCE) campaign of 837 BCE in the region of Tabal, which was then constituted of 24 states.

During this campaign, Shalmaneser III crossed the Anti-Taurus Mountains, invaded the lands of the Tabalian king Tuwattis I and destroyed the settlements in his kingdom, forcing the latter to flee to his capital of Artulu. Shalmaneser III then besieged Artulu, but Tuwattis I immediately surrendered when the Neo-Assyrian army surrounded his city, and his son Kikki paid tribute to Shalmaneser III, as did the rulers of the 24 other states of the region without fighting, after which Kikki might have been installed by Shalmaneser III as the new king of Tabal.

The position of Tuwattis I in the dynastic history of Tabal is uncertain: he might have founded a new dynasty in Tabal in the 8th century BCE; or he might have alternatively been a member of an older dynasty founded by an ancestor of his.

The kings of the region of Tabal offered tribute to Shalmaneser III again in 836 BCE, after he had conquered the fortress of Uetaš during campaign in Melid.

During the century following the campaign of Shalmaneser III, the kingdom of Tabal had absorbed several of the nearby small states in the Tabalian region, likely through aggressive expansionism, to grow into the largest, and northernmost, of its six main kingdoms, with the others being Atuna, Tuwana, Ištuanda, Ḫubišna, and Šinuḫtu.

=== Submission to the Neo-Assyrian Empire ===
By c. 738 BC, the Tabalian region, including Tabal proper, had become a tributary of the Neo-Assyrian king Tiglath-pileser III (r. 745 – 727 BCE), either after his conquest of Arpad over the course of 743 to 740 BC caused the states of the Tabalian region to submit to him, or possibly as a result of a campaign of Tiglath-pileser III in Tabal.

In the middle of the 8th century BCE, Tabal was ruled by the king Tuwattis II, who might have been a descendant of Kikki. Some time before 738 BC, Tuwattis II, along with the kings Warpalawas II of Tuwana and Ašḫiti of Atuna, offered tribute to Tiglath-pileser III; Tabal's tribute to the Neo-Assyrian Empire at this time consisted of horses, oxen and sheep.

=== Regional hegemony ===
Several inscriptions by people referring to themselves as servants of Tuwattis II found to the north-east of the region around Kululu and Sultanhan, and a lead strip mentioning a "Lord Tuwattis" to the north of the Halys river, suggest that Tabal was during this time using one of these two locations as a base for consolidating its power in northwestern Cappadocia. Thus, Tuwattis II, and possibly his son Wasusarmas after him, had interests in the region to the north of the Halys river, and the region to the north of the Halys river might itself have been ruled by either Tabal directly or by a vassal of Tuwattis II named Muwatalis.

One sub-kingdom within the territory of Tabal was ruled by a man named Ruwas who styled himself as the "servant of Tuwattis" on several stelae erected in the Tabalian capital. This Ruwas described himself as the "lord-house" (Hieroglyphic Luwian: 𔔙𔗐𔖺𔗐𔓯𔗆, parni=nannis) of his overlords and styled himself as "the sun-blessed one" (Hieroglyphic Luwian: 𔐓𔗦𔓷𔓚𔗬𔖱𔖻𔖭, asḫa tiwaramis) which were titles used by caretaker rulers who were in the service of great rulers.

Tuwattis II was succeeded by his son, Wasusarmas, who was also a tribute-paying vassal of the Neo-Assyrian Empire.

Wasusarmas regarded himself as the local hegemon of the Tabalian region, and he styled himself and his father using the prestigious titles of "Great King" (Hieroglyphic Luwian: 𔐒, romanized: uras ḫantawattis) and "Hero" (Hieroglyphic Luwian: 𔐕, romanized: ḫastallis). Along with the revival of this title by the possibly contemporary king Ḫartapus who ruled a state further to the west, this was the first time that a Luwian ruler had adopted these imperial Hittite titles after the end of their use by the rulers of Karkamiš in the 10th century BC.

Wasusarmas's use of these titles for himself and his father appears to have been significant enough that the various rulers of the Tabalian region either identified or rejected it, and some other Tabalian rulers, such as Warpalawas II of Tuwana and Kiyakiyas of Šinuḫtu, might possibly have been his vassals.

Thanks to the renewed interest of powers like the Neo-Assyrian into the Tabalian region at this time, Wasusarmas was able to build his kingdom into a powerful and influential state: during the 8th century BC first appear the oldest datable Luwian monuments and inscriptions from the Tabalian region, with the earliest of them dating from the reign of Tuwattis II; most of these inscriptions were commissioned by servants of Tuwattis II and Wasusarmas; the Tabalian elite became rich and powerful enough to invest in these self-aggrandising monuments thanks to a political and cultural flourishing made possible by being clients of the Neo-Assyrian Empire.

Wasusarmas's expansionist ventures brought him into conflict with a coalition of eight enemy rulers attempting to encroach on the Tabalian region that was led by the king of Phrygia or by king Ḫartapus in the Konya-Karaman Plains, and which Wasusarmas claimed to have defeated with the help of the kings Warpalawas II of Tuwana, Kiyakiyas of Šinuḫtu, and the otherwise unknown king Ruwandas. This victory allowed Wasusarmas to expand his borders to the west.

=== Deposition of Wasusarmas ===
Despite being a Neo-Assyrian tributary, Wasusarmas continued using the titles of "Great King" and "Hero"; since the Neo-Assyrian Empire sought to prevent local rulers from becoming too powerful, Tiglath-pileser III accused Wasusarmas of acting as his equal, in consequence of which he deposed him around c. 732 to c. 730 BC and replaced him as king of Tabal with a man named Ḫullî. The deposition of Wasusarmas resulted in a power vacuum in the Tabalian region, and no subsequent ruler from the Tabalian region claimed the title of "Great King" again after him.

The deposition of Wasusarmas showed that the status of client kingship had its downsides: once he had become the client of a more powerful state, his position became drastically more complicated and uncertain. While he could claim powerful military support and obtain economic advantages from this arrangement, the tribute and corvee demands could set into motion popular revolt and provide reasons for rival political factions to move against Wasusarmas, who was thus caught between the demands of his suzerain and the ambitions of his subjects. However, the Neo-Assyrian response made it clear that dissent would not be tolerated and informed other kings that peace with the Neo-Assyrian Empire would depend on its generosity rather than on a specific local individual.

The identity of Ḫullî is still uncertain: although Neo-Assyrian sources referred to him as a commoner, he might have instead been the same individual as Ḫulis the nephew of Ruwas, the vassal of Tuwattis II, who had erected a stele in his uncle's honour in the Tabalian capital of Artulu, or alternatively he could have been of northern Syrian origin.

The raising of Ḫullî to kingship was the first of a series of direct Neo-Assyrian interventions in the Tabalian region and established the trend in the relations between it and the Neo-Assyrian Empire. With Tiglath-pileser III having ejected Urartu from this region, he could focus on fostering and exploiting his dependencies there: the Tabalian vassal states were expected to maintain internal security, inform the Neo-Assyrian Empire, provide the Neo-Assyrian authorities access to natural resources, pay tribute and support Neo-Assyrian ventures as was needed from them, in return of which Neo-Assyrian power granted favours to the Tabalian kings and likely promised to help them during emergencies. Being completely understanding of the nuances of client-patron relations, Tiglath-pileser III managed his vassals with a prudent balance of threats and subsidies.

The deposition of Wasusarmas and his replacement by Ḫullî did not solve the problems which Neo-Assyrian power was facing in Tabal, and Neo-Assyrian policy in the Tabalian region throughout the 8th century BCE would continue being characterised by an inability to find any compatible partners there. Thus, in 726 BCE Tiglath-pileser III's son and successor, Shalmaneser V (r. 727 – 722 BCE), deported Ḫullî along with his whole family to Assyria, possibly because Ḫullî had conspired with Phrygia.

The situation of Tabal during the exile of Ḫullî is unknown, although the deportation of its king likely to have resulted in the leadership vacuum there. Alternatively, another Tuwattis, possibly a son of Wasusarmas II, might have been installed on the throne of Tabal after the deportation of Ḫullî.

Meanwhile, the kingdom of Atuna appears to have benefited from the deportation of Ḫullî, with the power vacuum in Tabal proper having allowed it to become a local power in the Tabalian region.

=== Between Phrygia and Assyria ===
Following the union of the Phrygians and the Muški under the Phrygian king Midas, his kingdom became a major rival to Neo-Assyrian power in eastern Anatolia, and the region of Tabal became contested between the Neo-Assyrian and Phrygian empires.

Midas tried to convince the still independent local rulers of Tabal to switch their allegiances to Phrygia, and several of them accepted his offer. Shalmaneser V's successor, Sargon II (r. 722 – 705 BC), reacted by restoring Neo-Assyrian power in the Tabalian region, from where deported the rebellious rulers to Assyria and gave their cities to rulers who had remained loyal to him, and settled Assyrians and other foreigners in Tabal.

=== Kingdom of Bīt-Burutaš ===
Sargon II's main preoccupation regarding the region of Tabal was to secure the whole of it from Phrygian attacks from the north-west, and, fearing that the void left in the leadership of Tabal would worsen the threat posed by Phrygia and Urartu to Neo-Assyrian interests in Anatolia, in 721 BC he restored Ḫullî to Tabal's throne after returning him and his family back there. Thus, the Neo-Assyrian Empire had to navigate a situation where it sought to prevent local rulers from becoming too powerful while also preventing chaos which could allow other powers to become influential there or where Neo-Assyrian power would have no partners in the region.

This restoration of Ḫullî on the throne of Tabal might itself have been linked to the power struggle within the Neo-Assyrian Empire which led to Sargon II seizing power from Shalmaneser V. It is possible that the tradition of Hieroglyphic Luwian inscriptions in the kingdom of Tabal might have ended with the appointment of Ḫullî, whose deportation to Assyria before his restoration as well as the re-education of his son at the Neo-Assyrian court might have distanced him from the Neo-Hittite cultural traditions.

By this time, Tabal's western borders had expanded so as to reach the region of modern Konya and its southern borders extended to the northern border of the country of Ḫilakku.

Sargon II soon appointed Ḫullî's son Ambaris as his successor to the kingship of Tabal: Ambaris had himself been re-educated in Assyria during his family's exile there, and his pledges of loyalty had convinced Sargon II that Ambaris could be trusted and be placed on the throne of Tabal. Additionally, Sargon II desperately tried to ensure the loyalty of Ambaris and augment his position above those of the other Tabalian kings by marrying him to his own daughter, Aḫat-abiša, and gave them Ḫilakku as dowry.

However, since Ḫilakku itself had remained mostly independent of Neo-Assyrian authority, it is unlikely that Ambaris ever held any concrete power there. Sargon II's conferring of authority over Ḫilakku to him appears to have instead been due to the unavailabiliy of any other land that he could offer Ambaris after he had given the northwestern part of Wasusarmas's kingdom, corresponding to the region of present-day Suvasa, Topada and Göstesin, to Kurtî of Atuna when he had handed over the territory of Šinuḫtu to him in 718 BC after he had repressed the rebellion of its king Kiyakiyas.

Sargon II himself claimed to have "widened the land" which he had given to Ambaris, and this new enlarged and reorganised kingdom of Tabal was given the new name of Bīt-Burutaš: this reorganisation was part of Sargon II's attempt to establish a centralised authority in the region of Tabal in the form of a single united kingdom incorporating most of the region under a ruler whom he could trust so as to more efficiently impose Neo-Assyrian authority there and better contain the threat posed by the Phrygian king Midas to Neo-Assyrian power in Anatolia.

Thus, by reorganising Tabal as Bīt-Burutaš and appointing Ambaris as its king, Sargon II was trying to reinforce Neo-Assyrian authority in the Tabalian region against Phrygian expansionism and attempting to restore Neo-Assyrian control there. However, likely beginning in 714 BC, Ambaris came under pressure from Midas, who attempted to persuade him to renounce Neo-Assyrian allegiance and join him, initially through diplomatic means and later through military threats.

Since Ambaris had been educated at the Assyrian court along with Neo-Assyrian princes, it is possible that his experience had instilled in him a significant sense of Assyrian identity, and he might therefore have possibly not have continued the local monumental traditions of the Tabalian region.

Ambaris himself came under pressure from Midas, who attempted to persuade him to renounce Neo-Assyrian allegiance and join him, initially through diplomatic means and later through military threats. Because Phrygia directly bordered Bīt-Burutaš in the south-east, and Ambaris was not capable of efficiently defending his new kingdom against the Phrygian armies who were able to rapidly march to his cities, he therefore found himself forced to make the difficult decision of remaining loyal to Sargon II and lose his kingdom and throne to Phrygia and Urartu, or allying with these latter rivals of the Neo-Assyrian Empire and face a military response by Sargon II.

With Sargon II occupied by his campaign in Urartu in 714 BC, Ambaris was left with no significant military support from the Neo-Assyrian Empire with which he could have defended Bīt-Burutaš, and therefore had little choice but to accept an alliance with Phrygia and renounce his allegiance to the Neo-Assyrian Empire.

Despite Sargon II having successfully attacked and defeated Urartu in 714 BC, the new Urartian king Argišti II continued the attempts to expand Urartian influence on the Neo-Assyrian vassals, especially those to the west of the Euphrates, on the Anatolian plateau and the south-east coast of Anatolia.

Thus, both Phrygia and Urartu were trying to expand their power in these regions and challenge the sole supremacy of the Neo-Assyrian Empire there. Facing increased pressure from both of these powers, Ambaris communicated with them seeking guarantees that they would protect him should he break his ties with the Neo-Assyrian Empire.

=== Annexation by the Neo-Assyrian Empire ===
Tabal
- Province of the Neo-Assyrian Empire
- 713 BC–705 BC
- Capital: Adanawa
- Government
- King
  - r. 713 – 705 BC: Sargon II
- Governor
  - c. 713 BC: Aššur-šarru-uṣur
- History
  - Annexation of Bīt-Burutaš: 713 BC
  - Death of Sargon II: 705 BC
Preceded by	Succeeded by
Bīt-Burutaš	Tabal
- Today part of: Turkey

Neo-Assyrian intelligence however intercepted Ambaris's messages to Phrygia and Urartu, causing him to lose favour with Sargon II, who accused him of conspiring with Phrygia and Urartu, and consequently deported Ambaris, his family and his chief courtiers to Assyria in 713 BCE.

Following the deportation of Ambaris, Bīt-Burutaš was annexed into the Neo-Assyrian Empire and made into a province, and Sargon II appointed the eunuch Aššur-šarru-uṣur as governor of Que based in Ḫiyawa who also held authority on Hilakku and Bīt-Burutaš and had general oversight on Tuwana. Thus, Bīt-Burutaš and Ḫilakku were placed under the administration of a Neo-Assyrian governor eunuch and were settled by people deported from other regions newly conquered by the Neo-Assyrian Empire, putting Tabal under direct Assyrian rule.

Sargon II also handed over part of the territory of Bīt-Burutaš to Warpalawas II of Tuwana, who had remained a loyal subject of the Neo-Assyrian Empire and had now become a token ruler under the authority of Aššur-šarru-uṣur.

Some fortifications in Tabal, along the tops of the Kulmaç hills and over a hill to the north-west of what is presently Topada might have been built in connection to the annexation of Bīt-Burutaš.

The annexation of Bīt-Burutaš and the deportation of Ambaris was impactful enough that it was able to convince the king Kurtî of Atuna, who had abandoned his allegiance to the Neo-Assyrian Empire and become a vassal of Midas, to submit to Sargon II again. However, around c. 710 BCE, Atuna and Ištuanda launched a joint attack on the cities of Bīt-Burutaš, although it is unknown whether Kurtî was still the king of Atuna by then.

The hostilities between the Neo-Assyrian and Phrygian empires soon came to and end by 710-709 BC, which in turn provided to Sargon II the opportunity to consolidate Neo-Assyrian rule over Anatolia, and especially the kingdoms of Tabal.

However, there is little evidence of Neo-Assyrian rule over Bīt-Burutaš: Assyrian-style curls on sculpture fragments attest of a general and possibly indirect artistic influence, cuneiform finds in the Tabalian region have been scarce, and the pottery remained of an indigenous type; and while Sargon II claimed to have settled deportees in Tabal, foreign communities have not yet been discovered while corroborating textual evidence is unclear. This might reflect the natural passing of time between nominal Neo-Assyrian annexation and the complete investment of the region.

=== End ===
In 705 BCE, Sargon II campaigned against the Cimmerians in Tabal but he died in battle against one Gurdî of Kulummu, ending Neo-Assyrian direct rule there, with the Tabalian region consequently becoming independent again while also becoming destabilised and vulnerable to the attacks of the Cimmerians.

With Sargon II's death, Bīt-Burutaš suddenly disappeared from Neo-Assyrian sources. And, after this, the Neo-Assyrian Empire stopped intervening in Anatolia while direct presence of Neo-Assyrian officials and military in Central Anatolia ceased being attested. And after Sargon II's son and successor, Sennacherib, had attacked Gurdî at Til-Garimmu but failed to capture him, the Neo-Assyrian Empire instead became limited to protecting its newly reduced borders running from Que to Melid to Ḫarran.

=== Aftermath ===
The subsequent fate of Tabal/Bīt-Burutaš is unclear, although, by the time that Sennacherib had been succeeded by his son Esarhaddon, the whole Tabalian region reappeared as a single kingdom under the reign of rulers such as Iškallû and Mugallu who were independent of the Neo-Assyrian Empire, suggesting that Tabal had been reconstituted after the end of Neo-Assyrian rule over Anatolia.

== List of rulers ==
- Tuwattis I (𔕬𔗬𔑣𔓯𔗔; Neo-Assyrian Akkadian: 𒁹𒌅𒀜𒋾, romanized: ᵐTuatti), r. unknown – c. 837 BC
- ᵐKikki (𒁹𒆠𒅅𒆠; Hieroglyphic Luwian: Kiyakiyas or *Kiyakis), r. c. 837 BC – unknown
- Tuwattis II (𔕬𔓬𔑣𔕣), r. c. mid 8th century BC
- Wasusarmas (𔓬𔖢𔑙𔒅𔗔; Neo-Assyrian Akkadian: 𒁹𒌑𒊍𒋩𒈨, romanized: ᵐUassurme or ᵐWassurme), r. c. 740 BC – 730 BC
- ᵐḪullî (𒁹𒄷𒌌𒇷𒄿; Hieroglyphic Luwian: *Ḫulliyas), r. 730 BC – c. 726 BC, c. 721 BC
- ᵐAmbaris (𒁹𒄠𒁀𒊑𒄑), r. c. 721 BC – 713 BC

== Sources ==
- Adalı, Selim Ferruh (2017). "Cimmerians and the Scythians: the Impact of Nomadic Powers on the Assyrian Empire and the Ancient Near East". In Kim, Hyun Jin; Vervaet, Frederik Juliaan; Adalı, Selim Ferruh (eds.). Eurasian Empires in Antiquity and the Early Middle Ages Contact and Exchange between the Graeco- Roman World, Inner Asia and China. Cambridge: Cambridge University Press. pp. 60–82. ISBN 978-1-107-19041-2.
- Adalı, Selim Ferruh (2023). "The Phantom Menace? The Chronology of Cimmerian Expeditions, Territories and Zones of Influence in Anatolia". In Draycott, Catherine M.; Branting, Scott; Lehner, Joseph W.; Özarslan, Yasemin (eds.). From Midas to Cyrus and Other Stories: Papers on Iron Age Anatolia in Honour of Geoffrey and Françoise Summers. BIAA Monograph Series. London, United Kingdom: British Institute at Ankara. pp. 209–228. ISBN 978-1-912-09011-2.
- Adiego, Ignasi-Xavier (2019). "The Survival of the God Name Šarruma in Cilician Names in the Greek Sources". Altorientalische Forschungen [Ancient Near Eastern Research]. 46 (2). Walter de Gruyter: 147–160. doi:10.1515/aofo-2019-0010.
- Aro, S. (2013). "Tabal". In Streck, Michael P. [in German]; Frantz-Szabó, Gabriella; Krebernik, Manfred [in German]; Bonacossi, D. Morandi; Postgate, J. N.; Seidl, Ursula [in German]; Stol, M.; Wilhelm, Gernot [in German] (eds.). Reallexikon der Assyriologie und Vorderasiatischen Archäologie [Encyclopaedia of Ancient Near Eastern Studies] (in German). Vol. 13. Berlin, Germany; New York City, United States: Walter de Gruyter. ISBN 978-3-110-30715-3.
- Aro, S. (2014). "Uassurme". In Streck, Michael P. [in German]; Frantz-Szabó, Gabriella; Krebernik, Manfred [in German]; Bonacossi, D. Morandi; Postgate, J. N.; Seidl, Ursula [in German]; Stol, M.; Wilhelm, Gernot [in German] (eds.). Reallexikon der Assyriologie und Vorderasiatischen Archäologie [Encyclopaedia of Ancient Near Eastern Studies] (in German). Vol. 14. Berlin, Germany; New York City, United States: Walter de Gruyter. p. 257. ISBN 978-3-110-41761-6.
- Aro, Sanna (2023). "Vanishing kingdoms: Tabal and Tuwana during the seventh century BC". In Draycott, Catherine M.; Branting, Scott; Lehner, Joseph W.; Özarslan, Yasemin (eds.). From Midas to Cyrus and Other Stories: Papers on Iron Age Anatolia in Honour of Geoffrey and Françoise Summers. BIAA Monograph Series. London, United Kingdom: British Institute at Ankara. pp. 113–135. ISBN 978-1-912-09011-2.
- Baker, Heather D. (2023). "The Assyrian Empire: A View from Within". In Radner, Karen; Moeller, Nadine; Potts, Daniel T. (eds.). The Age of Assyria. The Oxford History of the Ancient Near East. Vol. 4. New York City, United States: Oxford University Press. pp. 257–351. ISBN 978-0-190-68763-2.
- Bryce, Trevor (2009). The Routledge Handbook of the Peoples and Places of Ancient Western Asia: From the Early Bronze Age to the Fall of the Persian Empire. London, United Kingdom: Routledge. ISBN 978-0-415-39485-7.
- Bryce, Trevor (2012). The World of The Neo-Hittite Kingdoms: A Political and Military History. Oxford, United Kingdom: Oxford University Press. ISBN 978-0-199-21872-1.
- D'Alfonso, Lorenzo (2012). "Tabal, an 'out-group' definition in the first Millennium BCE". In Lanfranchi, Giovanni B.; Bonacossi, Daniele Morandi; Pappi, Cinzia; Ponchia, Simonetta [in German] (eds.). Leggo! Studies Presented to Frederick Mario Fales on the Occasion of His 65ᵗʰ Birthday. Wiesbaden, Germany: Harrassowitz Verlag. pp. 173–194. ISBN 978-3-447-06659-4.
- D'Alfonso, Lorenzo (2019). "War in Anatolia in the post-Hittite period: the Anatolian Hieroglyphic inscription of TOPADA revised". Journal of Cuneiform Studies. 71. University of Chicago Press for the American Schools of Oriental Research: 133–152. doi:10.1086/703857.
- D'Alfonso, Lorenzo; Pedrinazzi, Matteo (2021). "Forgetting an Empire, Creating a New Order: Trajectories of Rock-cut Monuments from Hittite into Post-Hittite Anatolia, and the Afterlife of the "Throne" of Kızıldağ". In Ben-Dov, Jonathan; Rojas, Felipe (eds.). Afterlives of Ancient Rock-cut Monuments in the Near East: Carvings in and out of Time. Culture and History of the Ancient Near East. Vol. 123. Leiden, Netherlands: BRILL. pp. 114–160. ISBN 978-9-004-46208-3.
- Ebeling, E. [in German] (1932). "Ambaris". In Ebeling, Erich [in German]; Meissner, Bruno (eds.). Reallexikon der Assyriologie und Vorderasiatischen Archäologie [Encyclopaedia of Ancient Near Eastern Studies] (in German). Vol. 1. Berlin, Germany; Leipzig, Germany: Walter de Gruyter. pp. 93–94. ISBN 978-3-112-35785-9.
- Giusfredi, Federico; Pisaniello, Valerio; Rizza, Alfredo (2021). "On the origin and meaning of the Assyrian toponym Tabal". Aramazd. Armenian Journal of Near Eastern Studies. 15 (1–2): 128–140. doi:10.32028/ajnes.v15i1-2.1301.
- Goedegebuure, Petra; van den Hout, Theo; Osborne, James; Massa, Michele; Bachhuber, Christoph; Şahin, Fatma (2020). "TÜRKMEN-KARAHÖYÜK 1: a new Hieroglyphic Luwian inscription from Great King Hartapu, son of Mursili, conqueror of Phrygia". Anatolian Studies: Journal of the British Institute at Ankara. 70. Cambridge University Press on behalf of the British Institute at Ankara: 29–43. doi:10.1017/S0066154620000022.
- Grousset, René (1970). The Empire of the Steppes: A History of Central Asia. Translated by Walford, Naomi. New Brunswick, United States: Rutgers University Press. ISBN 978-0-813-51304-1.
- Hawkins, J. D. [in German] (1975). "Ḫulli". In Edzard, Dietz Otto; Calmeyer, P.; Moortgat, A.; Otten, H.; Röllig, Wolfgang [in German]; v. Soden, W.; Wiseman, D. J. (eds.). Reallexikon der Assyriologie und Vorderasiatischen Archäologie [Encyclopaedia of Ancient Near Eastern Studies]. Vol. 4. Berlin, Germany; New York City, United States: Walter de Gruyter. pp. 490–491. ISBN 978-3-110-06772-9.
- Hawkins, John David [in German] (2000b). Inscriptions of the Iron Age, Part 2: Text: Amuq, Aleppo, Hama, Tabal, Assur Letters, Miscellaneous, Seals, Indices. Corpus of Hieroglyphic Luwian Inscriptions. Vol. 1. Berlin, Germany; New York City, United States: Walter de Gruyter. ISBN 978-3-110-10864-4.
- Hawkins, John David [in German] (2000c). Inscriptions of the Iron Age, Part 3: Plates. Corpus of Hieroglyphic Luwian Inscriptions. Vol. 1. Berlin, Germany; New York City, United States: Walter de Gruyter. ISBN 978-3-110-10864-4.
- Hawkins, J. D. [in German] (2014). "Urballa". In Streck, Michael P. [in German]; Frantz-Szabó, Gabriella; Krebernik, Manfred [in German]; Bonacossi, D. Morandi; Postgate, J. N.; Seidl, Ursula [in German]; Stol, M.; Wilhelm, Gernot [in German] (eds.). Reallexikon der Assyriologie und Vorderasiatischen Archäologie [Encyclopaedia of Ancient Near Eastern Studies] (in German). Vol. 14. Berlin, Germany; New York City, United States: Walter de Gruyter. ISBN 978-3-110-41761-6.
- Ivantchik, Askold (1993a). Les Cimmériens au Proche-Orient [The Cimmerians in the Near East] (PDF) (in French). Fribourg, Switzerland; Göttingen, Germany: Éditions Universitaires Fribourg (Switzerland); Vandenhoeck & Ruprecht (Germany). ISBN 978-3-727-80876-0.
- Melville, Sarah C. (2010). "Kings of Tabal: Politics; Competition, and Conflict in a Contested Periphery". In Richardson, Seth (ed.). Rebellions and Peripheries in the Cuneiform World. New Haven, United States: American Oriental Society. ISBN 978-0-940-49023-9.
- Novotny, Jamie (2023). "The Assyrian Empire in Contact with the World". In Radner, Karen; Moeller, Nadine; Potts, Daniel T. (eds.). The Age of Assyria. The Oxford History of the Ancient Near East. Vol. 4. New York City, United States: Oxford University Press. pp. 352–423. ISBN 978-0-190-68763-2.
- Olbrycht, Marek Jan (2000a). "The Cimmerian Problem Re-Examined: the Evidence of the Classical Sources". In Pstrusińska, Jadwiga [in Polish]; Fear, Andrew (eds.). Collectanea Celto-Asiatica Cracoviensia. Kraków: Księgarnia Akademicka. pp. 71–100. ISBN 978-8-371-88337-8.
- Payne, Annick (2023). "The Kingdom of Phrygia". In Radner, Karen; Moeller, Nadine; Potts, Daniel T. (eds.). The Age of Assyria. The Oxford History of the Ancient Near East. Vol. 4. New York City, United States: Oxford University Press. pp. 865–911. ISBN 978-0-190-68763-2.
- Phillips, E. D. (1972). "The Scythian Domination in Western Asia: Its Record in History, Scripture and Archaeology". World Archaeology. 4 (2): 129–138. doi:10.1080/00438243.1972.9979527. JSTOR 123971.
- Simon, Zsolt (2013). "Where is the Land of Sura of the Hieroglyphic Luwian Inscription KARKAMIŠ A4b and Why Were Cappadocians Called Syrians by Greeks?". Altorientalische Forschungen [Ancient Near Eastern Research]. 39 (1). Walter de Gruyter: 167–180. doi:10.1524/aofo.2012.0011.
- Simon, Zsolt (2017). "The Northern Border of Tabal". L'hittitologie aujourd'hui: Études sur l'Anatolie hittite et néo-hittite à l'occasion du centenaire de la naissance d'Emmanuel Laroche: 5e Rencontres d'archéologie de l'IFEA, Istanbul 21-22 novembre 2014 [Hittitology today: Studies on Hittite and Neo-Hittite Anatolia in Honor of Emmanuel Laroche's 100th Birthday: 5th IFEA Archeology Meetings, Istanbul November 21–22, 2014]. Istanbul, Turkey: Institut français d'études anatoliennes. pp. 201–211. ISBN 978-2-362-45083-9.
- Simon, Zsolt (2018). "Sapaziti, Sapalulme und die Suppiluliumas von W/Pal(a)stin(a/i)" [Sapaziti, Sapalulme and the Suppiluliumas of W/Pal(a)stin(a/i)]. Altorientalische Forschungen [Ancient Near Eastern Research]. 45 (1). Walter de Gruyter: 122–132. doi:10.1515/aofo-2018-0011.
- Starke, Frank [in German] (2006). "Asia Minor". In Cancik, Hubert [in German]; Schneider, Helmuth [in German]; Salazar, Christine F.; Möller, Astrid [in German]; Ruppel, Antonia; Warburton, David [in German] (eds.). Brill's New Pauly: Encyclopaedia of the Ancient World. Vol. 2. Leiden, Netherlands; Boston, United States: Brill. pp. 118–130. doi:10.1163/1574-9347_bnp_e614980. ISBN 90-04-12265-6.
- Sulimirski, Tadeusz; Taylor, T. F. (1991). "The Scythians". In Boardman, John; Edwards, I. E. S.; Hammond, N. G. L.; Sollberger, E.; Walker, C. B. F. (eds.). The Assyrian and Babylonian Empires and other States of the Near East, from the Eighth to the Sixth Centuries B.C. The Cambridge Ancient History. Vol. 3. Cambridge, United Kingdom: Cambridge University Press. pp. 547–590. ISBN 978-1-139-05429-4.
- Tokhtas’ev, Sergei R. [in Russian] (1991). "Cimmerians". Encyclopædia Iranica. New York City, United States: Encyclopædia Iranica Foundation; Brill Publishers.
- Weeden, Mark (2010). "Tuwati and Wasusarma: Imitating the Behaviour of Assyria". Iraq. 72. British Institute for the Study of Iraq: 39–61. doi:10.1017/S0021088900000589.
- Weeden, Mark (2017). "Tabal and the Limits of Assyrian Imperialism". In Heffron, Yağmur; Stone, Adam; Worthington, Martin (eds.). At the Dawn of History: Ancient Near Eastern Studies in Honour of J. N. Postgate. Vol. 2. Winona, United States: Eisenbrauns. pp. 721–736. ISBN 978-1-57506-471-0.
- Weeden, Mark (2023). "The Iron Age States of Central Anatolia and Northern Syria". In Radner, Karen; Moeller, Nadine; Potts, Daniel T. (eds.). The Age of Assyria. The Oxford History of the Ancient Near East. Vol. 4. New York City, United States: Oxford University Press. pp. 912–1026. ISBN 978-0-190-68763-2.
- Younger, K. Lawson Jr. (2009). "Two Epigraphic Notes on the New Katumuwa Inscription from Zincirli". MAARAV, A Journal for the Study of the Northwest Semitic Languages and Literatures. 16 (2). Western Academic Press: 159–179. doi:10.1086/MAR200916202.
