= Warpalawas II =

King of Tuwana, reigned c.740 – c.705 BC

Warpallawas II
- King; Hero; The Just One
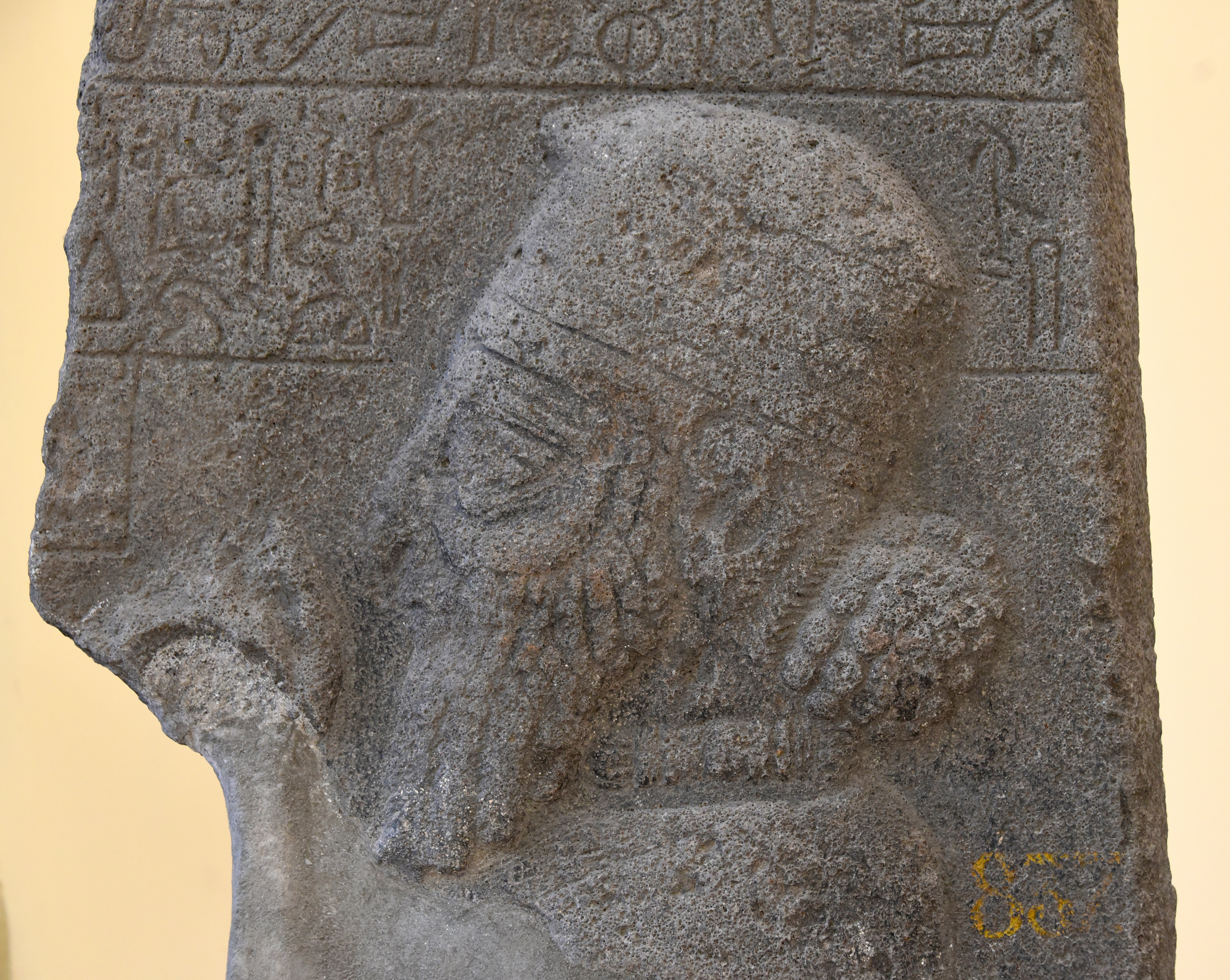
- Warpalawas II, king of Tuwana, prays in front of divine symbols. Detail of a stele from Bor. 8th century BC. Museum of the Ancient Orient, Istanbul

King of Tuwana
- Reign: c. 740s–c. 705 BC
- Predecessor: Muwaḫḫaranis I
- Successor: Muwaḫḫaranis II
- Born: c. early 8th century BC
- Died: c. 705 BC
- Issue: Muwaḫḫaranis II
- Luwian: 𔗬𔖱𔕸𔓊𔗬𔗔; Warpallawas
- Akkadian: 𒁹𒌨𒁄𒆷𒀀 ᵐUrpallâ
- House: Dynasty of Warpalawas I (?)
- Father: Muwaḫḫaranis I
- Religion: Luwian religion

Warpalawas II (Hieroglyphic Luwian: 𔗬𔖱𔕸𔓊𔗬𔗔, romanized: Warpallawas) was a king of the Neo-Hittite kingdom of Tuwana in the region of Tabal who reigned during the late 8th century BC, from around c. 740 to c. 705 BC.

== Name ==
=== Etymology ===
The Luwian name 𔗬𔖱𔕸𔓊𔗬𔗔 was pronounced Warpallawas and was derived by adding the adjectival suffix -wa- to the adjective warpallas/warpallis (𔗬𔖱𔕸𔔹𔗔), meaning lit. 'mighty' and lit. 'powerful', and cognate with the Hittite term warpallis (𒉿𒅈𒉺𒀠𒇺), meaning lit. 'strong'.

According to the linguist Ilya Yakubovich, warpallas/warpallis could also be used as a title meaning "warrior," while the -wa- denoted status, thus giving the name Warpallawas the meaning of lit. 'royal warrior'.

The linguist Rostyslav Oreshko meanwhile interprets warpallas/warpallis as a substantivised epithet of the Luwian Storm-god Tarḫunzas, meaning lit. 'the Powerful One', therefore giving to the name Warpallawas the meaning of lit. 'One of the Powerful', that is lit. 'One of Tarḫunzas', being thus semantically similar to the name Tarḫuniya (𒋻𒄷𒉌𒀀), meaning lit. 'Tarḫunzas-like'.

==== Cognates ====
A Lydian cognate of the name Warpallawas is attested in the form Ourpalos (Ουρπαλος) or Ourpalas (Ουρπαλας) recorded in Phrygia. A Pisidian cognate of Warpallawas is also attested in the form Ouarplio (Ουαρπλιο).

=== In Akkadian ===
Warpallawas II is referred to in Neo-Assyrian Akkadian sources as ᵐUrpallâ (𒁹𒌨𒁄𒆷𒀀) and ᵐUrpalaʾa (𒁹𒌨𒁄𒀀 and 𒁹𒌨𒉆𒈗𒀀).

== Life ==
Warpalawas II was the son of the previous king of Tuwana, Muwaḫḫaranis I.

Both Warpalawas II and Muwaḫḫaranis I may have been part of a dynasty which had ruled Tuwana for much of the 8th century BC, with another king of the same name, Warpalawas I, having possibly ruled Tuwana in the earlier 8th century BC, and who might have been an ancestor of Muwaḫḫaranis I and Warpalawas II.

=== Reign ===
Warpalawas II appears to have succeeded his father Muwaḫḫaranis I on the throne of Tuwana around c. 740 BC.

==== Submission to the Neo-Assyrian Empire ====
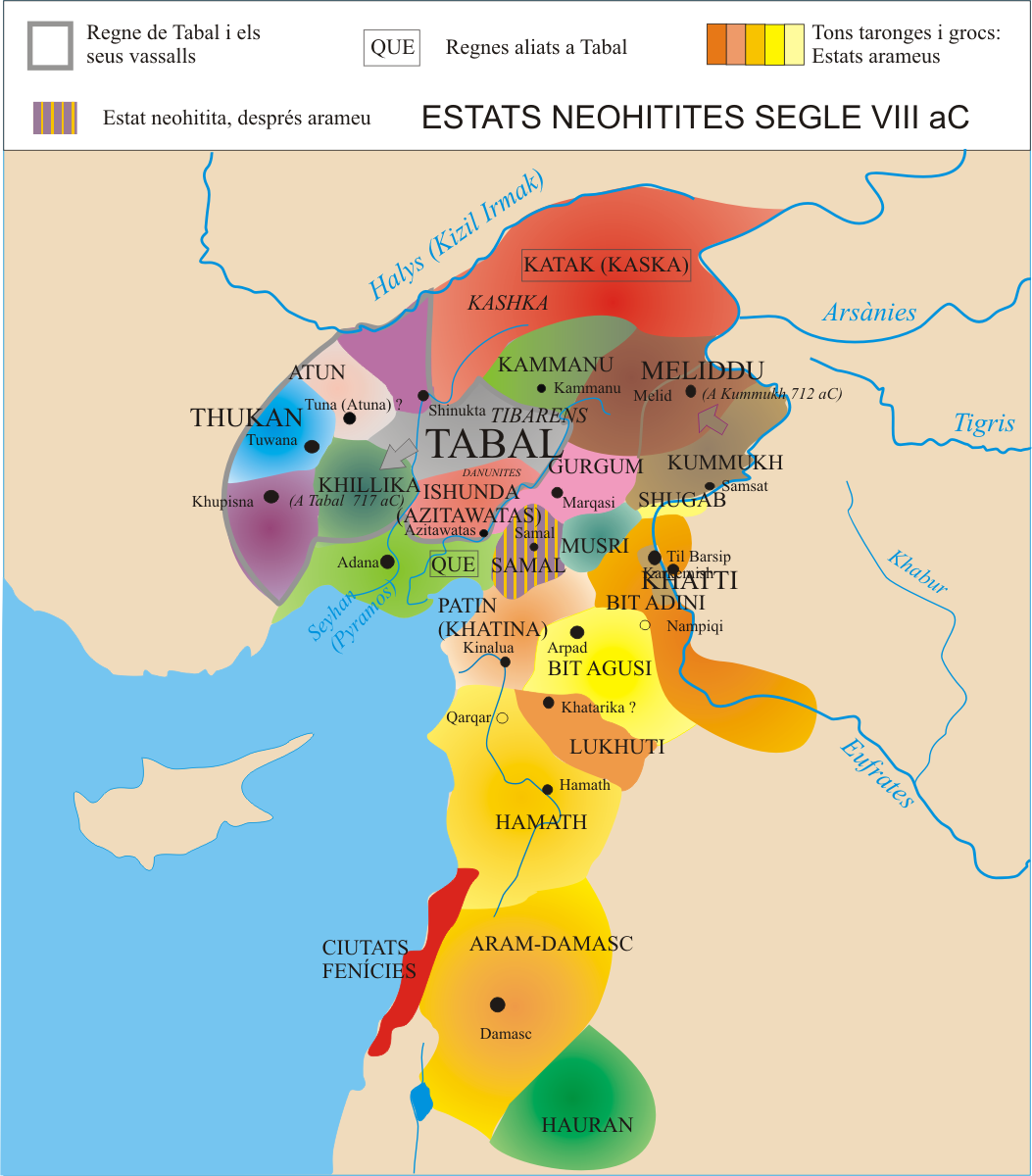
Tuwana on the map of Luwian (Neo-Hittite) and Aramean states during the 8th century BC.

Warpalawas II was mentioned in the records of the Neo-Assyrian Empire under the name of Urpallâ as one of five kings who offered tribute to Tiglath-Pileser III in 738 and 737 BC, along with Tuwattis II of Tabal and Ašḫiti of Atuna, and he appears to have maintained a policy of cooperating with the Neo-Assyrian Empire.

Warpalawas II's pro-Assyrian orientation is visible in how his monuments used an Assyrianising style of sculpture: the best known of these monuments is a relief from Ivriz, on which Warpalawas II, himself represented in Assyrian style, is depicted praying to the Luwian Storm-god Tarḫunzas, with both of the images being influenced by Neo-Assyrian artistic features; likewise, the Bor stele of Warpalawas II also depicted him in Assyrianising style, reflecting his close ties with the Neo-Assyrian Empire.

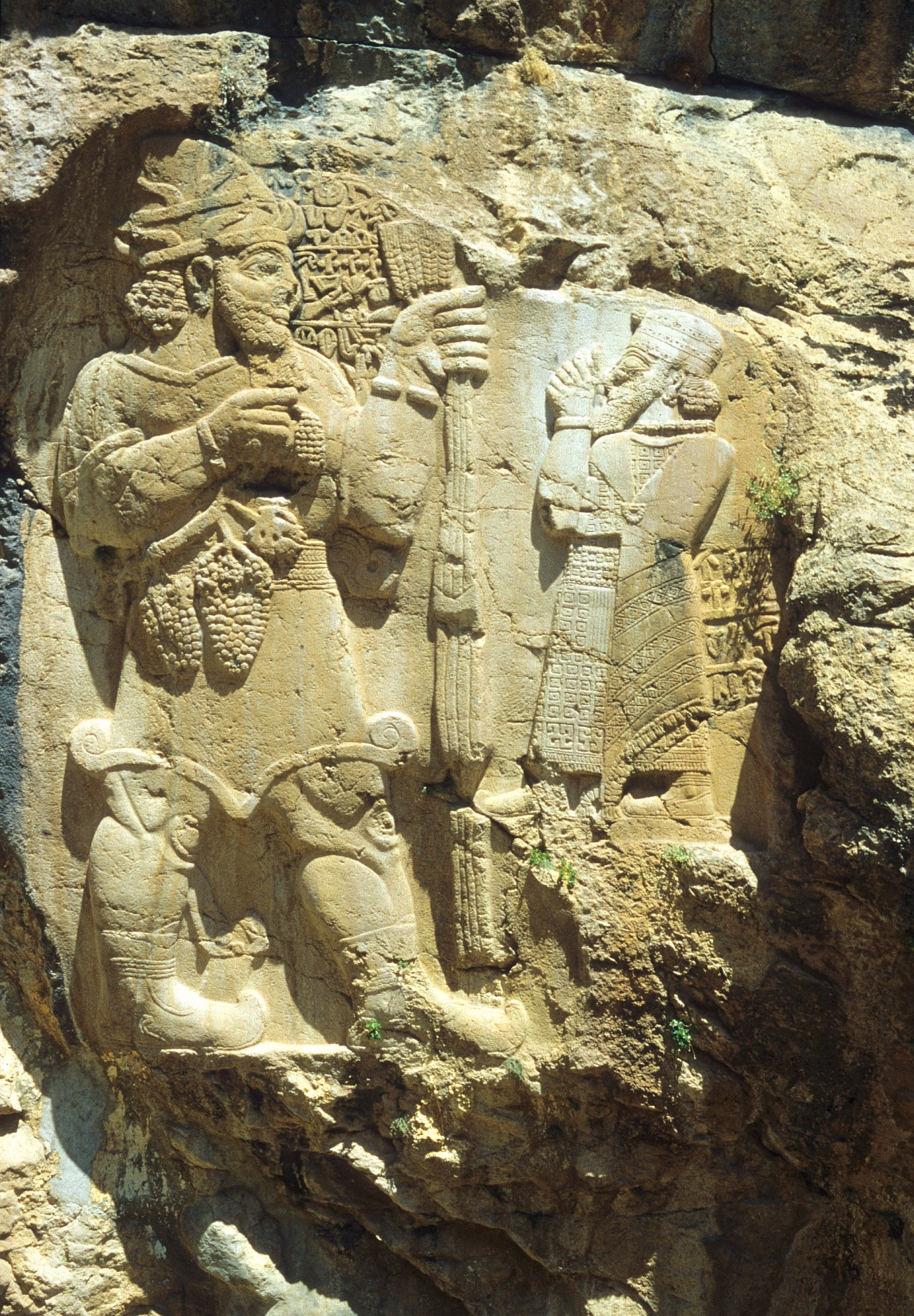
İvriz relief, depicting Warpalawas II (smaller, on the right) worshipping the Storm-god Tarḫunza (taller, on the left)

==== Vassals ====
The kingdom of Tuwana was powerful enough to have included a sub-kingdom, located at the site corresponding to present-day Porsuk, and ruled by a king named Tarḫunazzas who identified himself as a "servant" of Warpalawas II.

Tarḫunazzas himself recorded in his inscription that, in exchange for his services, Warpalawas II had rewarded him with Mount Mudi, which was a rocky outcrop of the Taurus Mountains near the Cilician Gates likely identical with the Mount Mulî mentioned in the records of the Neo-Assyrian Empire.

==== Relations with Tabal ====
The king Wasusarmas of the kingdom of Tabal claimed that Warpalawas II supported him during his war against a coalition of eight kings led by the king of Phrygia that was trying to encroach on the Tabalian region, although the veracity of Wasusarmas's claim regarding the participation of Warpalawas in this war as his ally is still uncertain.

==== Under direct Neo-Assyrian rule ====
Tuwana however was coming under the direct Neo-Assyrian rule during the later years of Warpalawas II's reign, especially following the annexation of the nearby kingdom of Tabal, then reorganised as the kingdom of Bīt-Burutaš. Its rebellious vassal king Ambaris was deported to Assyria in 713 BC, after which Sargon II appointed one Aššur-šarru-uṣur as governor of Que based in Ḫiyawa. Aššur-šarru-uṣur also held authority over Ḫilakku and the Tabalian region, including Bīt-Burutaš, as well as the general oversight over Tuwana.

Thus Tuwana and other nearby Anatolian kingdoms were placed the authority of Aššur-šarru-uṣur. Following the appointment of Aššur-šarru-uṣur, Warpalawas II of Tuwana and Awarikus of Ḫiyawa became largely symbolic rulers although they might have still held the power to manage their kingdoms locally.

The reason for these changes was due to the fact that, although Warpalawas II and Awarikus had been loyal Neo-Assyrian vassals, Sargon II considered them as being too elderly to be able to efficiently uphold Neo-Assyrian authority in southeastern Anatolia, where the situation had become volatile because of encroachment by the then growing power of Phrygian kingdom.

This reorganisation also increased Warpalawas II's authority in Tabal/Bīt-Burutaš so that Warpalawas II was ruling at least part of this kingdom's territory, as attested by Aššur-šarru-uṣur's report that two other Tabalian kingdoms, Atuna and Ištuanda, had seized certain cities of Bīt-Burutaš from Warpalawas II.

The attack by Atuna and Ištuanda caused Aššur-šarru-uṣur to worry that Warpallawas II might end up renouncing Neo-Assyrian overlordship. Nevertheless, Sargon II then informed him that Midas had made peace with Assyria, which would leave the Tabalian kings incapable of relying on Phrygian power against the Neo-Assyrian Empire.

Warpalawas II seems to have continued his pro-Assyrian policy throughout his reign, thanks to which he was able to rule in Tuwana for a very long period until at least c. 709 BC, at which date he was mentioned in the letter of Aššur-šarru-uṣur.

==== Relations with Phrygia ====
Warpalawas II also carried out relations with the Phrygian kingdom to the north-west of Tuwana, as attested by a report from c. 710 or c. 709 BC by Aššur-šarru-uṣur that Warpalawas II had demanded an audience with him in the company of an envoy of Midas of Phrygia, with Aššur-šarru-uṣur being doubtful whether Warpalawas II was indeed loyal to the Neo-Assyrian Empire.

This suggests that Warpalawas was one of the last still independent kings of the Tabal region who was being increasingly pressured by Phrygia and Assyria because of the location of his kingdom between these two powers.

Some Old Phrygian inscriptions on basalt, possibly dated from Warpalawas II's reign, as well as the robe decorated with Phrygian geometric designs depicted as worn by Warpalawas II in his Ivriz monument, suggest that aspects of Phrygian culture were arriving into Tuwana at this time.

The presence of the name "Midas" on one of these inscriptions has led to the archaeologist M. J. Mellink hypothesising that this was the king Midas of Phrygia, who had set up a monument in the city of his friend and ally, Warpalawas II. However, the long-time staunch pro-Assyrian orientation of Warpalawas II makes this hypothesis unlikely, and there is no evidence that Warpalawas II was ever an ally of Midas.

An alternative hypothesis regarding Phrygian influence in Tuwana, proposed by the Hittitologist Trevor Bryce, is that Midas might have attempted to fill the power vacuum left in Tabal that followed the death of Sargon II in battle in Tabal in c. 705 BC.

==== Legacy ====
Warpalawas II was succeeded by his son, Muwaḫḫaranis II.

== See also ==
- List of Neo-Hittite kings

== Sources ==
- Adiego, Ignasi-Xavier (2020). "The longest Pisidian inscription (Kesme 2)". Journal of Language Relationship. 15 (1–2). Russian State University for the Humanities; Institute of Linguistics of the Russian Academy of Sciences; Gorgias Press: 1–18. doi:10.31826/jlr-2017-151-205.
- Aro, Sanna (2023). "Vanishing kingdoms: Tabal and Tuwana during the seventh century BC". In Draycott, Catherine M.; Branting, Scott; Lehner, Joseph W.; Özarslan, Yasemin (eds.). From Midas to Cyrus and Other Stories: Papers on Iron Age Anatolia in Honour of Geoffrey and Françoise Summers. BIAA Monograph Series. London, United Kingdom: British Institute at Ankara. pp. 113–135. ISBN 978-1-912-09011-2.
- Bryce, Trevor (2009). The Routledge Handbook of the Peoples and Places of Ancient Western Asia: From the Early Bronze Age to the Fall of the Persian Empire. London, United Kingdom: Routledge. ISBN 978-0-415-39485-7.
- Bryce, Trevor (2012). The World of The Neo-Hittite Kingdoms: A Political and Military History. Oxford, United Kingdom: Oxford University Press. ISBN 978-0-199-21872-1.
- D'Alfonso, Lorenzo (2019). "War in Anatolia in the post-Hittite period: the Anatolian Hieroglyphic inscription of TOPADA revised". Journal of Cuneiform Studies. 71. University of Chicago Press for the American Schools of Oriental Research: 133–152. doi:10.1086/703857.
- D'Alfonso, Lorenzo; Pedrinazzi, Matteo (2021). "Forgetting an Empire, Creating a New Order: Trajectories of Rock-cut Monuments from Hittite into Post-Hittite Anatolia, and the Afterlife of the "Throne" of Kızıldağ". In Ben-Dov, Jonathan; Rojas, Felipe (eds.). Afterlives of Ancient Rock-cut Monuments in the Near East: Carvings in and out of Time. Culture and History of the Ancient Near East. Vol. 123. Leiden, Netherlands: BRILL. pp. 114–160. ISBN 978-9-004-46208-3.
- Hawkins, John D [in German] (2000a). Inscriptions of the Iron Age. Part 1: Text, Introduction, Karatepe, Karkamiš, Tell Ahmar, Maraş, Malatya, Commagene. Corpus of Hieroglyphic Luwian Inscriptions. Vol. 1. Berlin, Germany; New York City, United States: Walter de Gruyter. ISBN 978-3-110-10864-4.
- Hawkins, John David [in German] (2000b). Inscriptions of the Iron Age, Part 2: Text: Amuq, Aleppo, Hama, Tabal, Assur Letters, Miscellaneous, Seals, Indices. Corpus of Hieroglyphic Luwian Inscriptions. Vol. 1. Berlin, Germany; New York City, United States: Walter de Gruyter. ISBN 978-3-110-10864-4.
- Hawkins, John D. [in German] (2000c). Inscriptions of the Iron Age. Part 3: Plates. Corpus of Hieroglyphic Luwian Inscriptions. Vol. 1. Berlin, Germany; New York City, United States: Walter de Gruyter. ISBN 978-3-110-10864-4.
- Hawkins, J. D. [in German] (2014). "Urballa". In Streck, Michael P. [in German]; Frantz-Szabó, Gabriella; Krebernik, Manfred [in German]; Bonacossi, D. Morandi; Postgate, J. N.; Seidl, Ursula [in German]; Stol, M.; Wilhelm, Gernot [in German] (eds.). Reallexikon der Assyriologie und Vorderasiatischen Archäologie [Encyclopaedia of Ancient Near Eastern Studies]. Vol. 14. Berlin, Germany; New York City, United States: Walter de Gruyter. p. 408. ISBN 978-3-110-41761-6.
- Oreshko, Rostyslav (2020). "The onager kings of Anatolia: Hartapus, Gordis, Muška and the steppe strand in early Phrygian culture". Kadmos. Zeitschrift für vor- und frühgriechische Epigraphik [Kadmos: Journal of Pre- and Early Greek Epigraphy]. 59 (1–2). Walter de Gruyter: 77–128. doi:10.1515/kadmos-2020-0005.
- Weeden, Mark (2010). "Tuwati and Wasusarma: Imitating the Behaviour of Assyria". Iraq. 72. British Institute for the Study of Iraq: 39–61. doi:10.1017/S0021088900000589.
- Weeden, Mark (2017). "Tabal and the Limits of Assyrian Imperialism". In Heffron, Yağmur; Stone, Adam; Worthington, Martin (eds.). At the Dawn of History: Ancient Near Eastern Studies in Honour of J. N. Postgate. Vol. 2. Winona, United States: Eisenbrauns. pp. 721–736. ISBN 978-1-57506-471-0.
- Weeden, Mark (2023). "The Iron Age States of Central Anatolia and Northern Syria". In Radner, Karen; Moeller, Nadine; Potts, Daniel T. (eds.). The Age of Assyria. The Oxford History of the Ancient Near East. Vol. 4. New York City, United States: Oxford University Press. pp. 912–1026. ISBN 978-0-190-68763-2.
- Yakubovich, Ilya (2008). "Luwian Migrations in Light of Linguistic Contacts". In Collins, Billie Jean; Bachvarova, Mary R.; Rutherford, Ian C. [in German] (eds.). Anatolian Interfaces: Hittites, Greeks, and their Neighbors: Proceedings of an International Conference on Cross-cultural Interaction, September 17-19, 2004, Emory University, Atlanta, GA. Oxford, United Kingdom: Oxbow Books. pp. 123–134. ISBN 978-1-842-17270-4.
- Yakubovich, Ilya (2019). "The Mighty Weapon of Tarhunt". In Avetisyan, Pavel S.; Dan, Roberto; Grekyan, Yervand H. (eds.). Over the Mountains and Far Away: Studies in Near Eastern history and archaeology presented to Mirjo Salvini on the occasion of his 80th birthday. Oxford, United Kingdom: Archaeopress Publishing Limited. pp. 544–559. ISBN 978-1-784-91943-6.

Warpalawas II Warpalawas I's dynasty (?) Died: c. 705 BC
Regnal titles
Preceded by Muwaḫḫaranis I	King of Tuwana c. 740-c. 705 BC	Succeeded by Muwaḫḫaranis II
