= Atuna (state) =

Neo-Hittite state

Coordinates: 38.762003°N 35.0047741°E

𒌷𒀀𒌓𒈾 (Atuna)
- Early 1st millennium BCE–Unknown
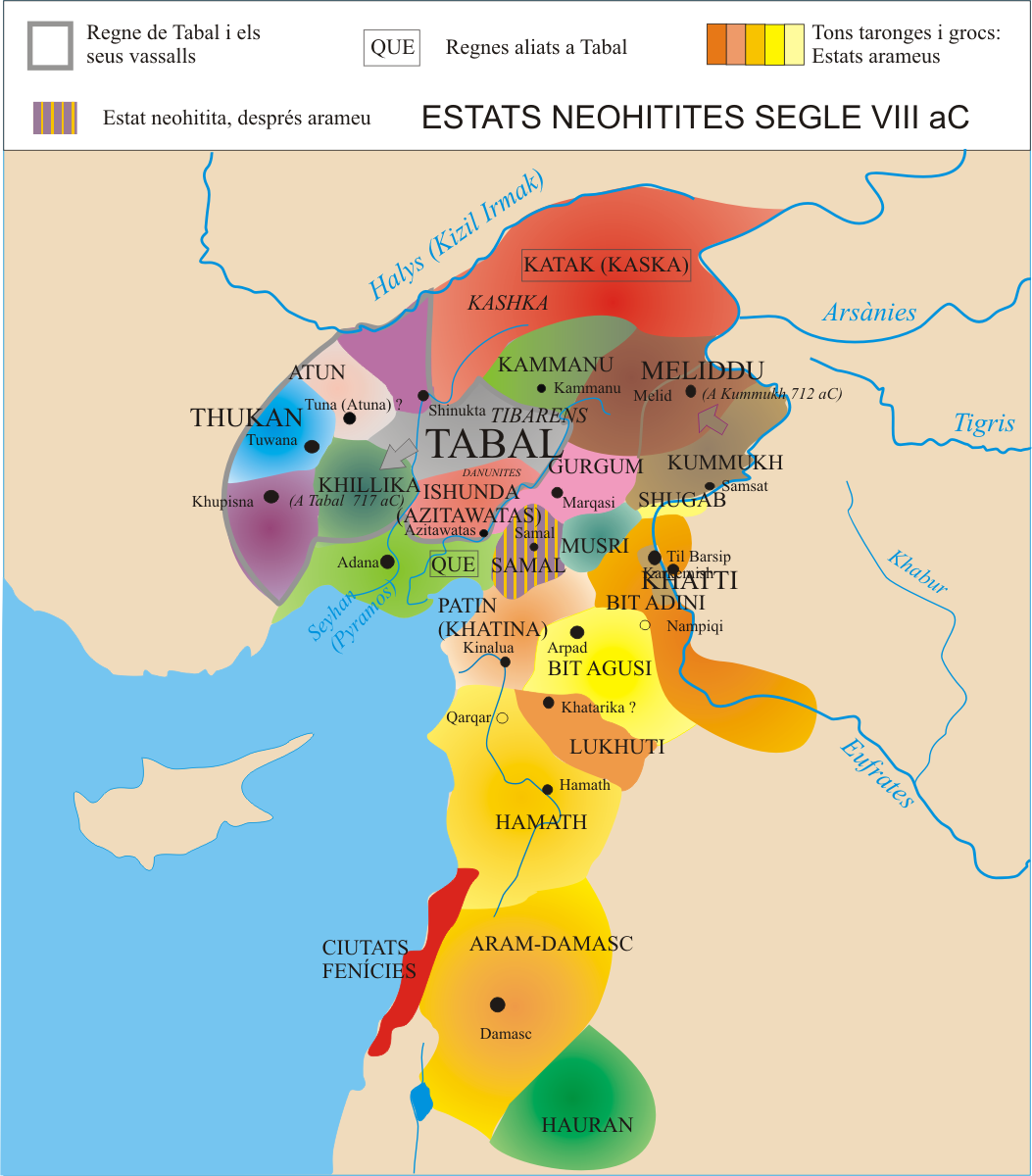
- Atuna among the Neo-Hittite states
- Capital: Atuna
- Common languages: Luwian
- Religion: Luwian religion
- Government: Monarchy
- King
  - r. c. 740 BCE: Ašḫiti/Ušḫitti
  - r. c. 730 BCE: Asḫwisis
  - r. c. 718 BCE: Kurtî

Vassal of the Neo-Assyrian Empire (c. 740s - c. 710s BCE)
- Historical era: Iron Age
  - Established: Early 1st millennium BCE
  - Transfer of Šinuḫtu's lands to Atuna: 718 BCE
  - Revolt of Kurtî: c. 713 BCE
  - Atunaean-Ištuandaean attack on Bīt-Burutaš: c. 710 BCE
  - Disestablished: Unknown
Preceded by
Hittite empire
- Today part of: Turkey

Atuna (Neo-Assyrian Akkadian: 𒌷𒀀𒌓𒈾) or Tuna (Neo-Assyrian Akkadian: 𒌷𒌅𒈾) was a Luwian-speaking Neo-Hittite state which existed in the region of Tabal in southeastern Anatolia in the Iron Age.

== Geography ==
=== Location ===
The exact location of Atuna is still unknown due to a present lack of Luwian inscriptions from the kingdom's capital, and, while the site of Zeyve Höyük, corresponding to classical Tynna, has been suggested as a possible location for the capital of Atuna, Atuna was instead likely located further north, in northern Cappadocia.

Since Atuna later obtained the territory of the Tabalian kingdom of Šinuḫtu, it was likely in the region immediately south of the Halys river's southernmost bend, to the immediate north of Šinuḫtu, and to the west of the kingdom of Tabal proper and around the site which the present-day village of Bohça, which was possibly its capital and where the king Kurtî of Atuna had erected a stele.

=== Neighbours ===
To the north, Atuna directly bordered on the southeastern boundaries of Phrygia.

== History ==
=== Bronze Age ===
The site that later became Atuna might have corresponded to the city which was known as Adunuwa (Hittite: 𒌷𒀀𒁺𒉡𒉿) during the Hittite Empire.

=== Iron Age ===
==== Kingdom of Atuna ====
The kingdom of Atuna might have come into existence during the early 1st millennium BCE, and one of the state's early kings might have been one of the 24 kings of the Tabalian region who offered tribute to the Neo-Assyrian king Shalmaneser III (r. 859 – 824 BCE) during his campaign there in 837 BCE.

During the century following the campaign of Shalmaneser III, the kingdom of Atuna had absorbed several of the nearby small states in the Tabalian region, growing territorially and in status, and becoming one of the region's six main kingdoms, with the others being Tabal, Tuwana, Ištuanda, Ḫubišna, and Šinuḫtu. Atuna was nonetheless of lesser size and status than the kingdom of Tabal itself.

===== Submission to the Neo-Assyrian Empire =====
By c. 738 BC, the Tabalian region, including Atuna, had become a tributary of the Neo-Assyrian king Tiglath-pileser III (r. 745 – 727 BCE), possibly after his conquest of Arpad over the course of 743 to 740 BC caused the states of the Tabalian region to submit to him, or possibly as a result of a campaign of Tiglath-pileser III in Tabal.

Consequently, during the middle of the 8th century BCE, Atuna was ruled by the king Ašḫiti or Ušḫitti, who was paying tribute to Tiglath-pileser III to prevent attacks against his kingdom by the Neo-Assyrian Empire, with two instances of payment being attested in 738 and 737 BCE.

In the late 8th century BCE, Atuna was ruled by the king Kurtî, who bore a Luwianised Phrygian name (Hieroglyphic Luwian: Kurdis, from *Gordiyas), and whose father Asḫwisis might have been identical with the Assyrian-attested Ašḫiti/Ušḫitti. Kurtî was himself initially loyal to the Neo-Assyrian Empire during the rules of Tiglath-pileser III, Shalmaneser V, and the early reign of Sargon II.

After Shalmaneser V had deported the king Ḫullî of Tabal proper, the power vacuum there benefited Atuna by allowing it to become a local power in the Tabalian region.

In the early 710s BCE, the king Kiyakiyas of Šinuḫtu had broken his oath of allegiance to the Neo-Assyrian Empire, in response to which the Neo-Assyrian king Sargon II (r. 722 – 705 BC) reacted through cautionary action meant to deter the other Tabalian kingdoms from rebelling by invading Šinuḫtu in 718 BCE and deposing Kiyakiyas, after which he handed over the territory of Šinuḫtu to Kurtî of Atuna to reward him for his loyalty and to secure his allegiance to the Neo-Assyrian Empire.

The transfer of the lands of Šinuḫtu to Kurtî appears to also have resulted in the incorporation into his kingdom of the territories once ruled by Wasusarmas of Tabal proper in the northwestern part of his kingdom corresponding to the region of present-day Suvasa, Topada and Göstesin. Compacted with the removal of the removal of Wasusarmas himself and of his ally Kiyakiyas, this benefited Kurtî's kingdom of Atuna and stimulated the growth of his power.

At one point, Kurtî had erected a stele near what is presently the village of Bohça, close to the south of the southernmost bend of the Halys, in which he mentioned his hunting expeditions in this region, which he claimed the gods Tarḫunzas and Runtiyas had offered him.

Since Atuna abutted Phrygia in the north, it was one of the Tabalian kingdoms which were the most vulnerable to possible Phrygian attacks or to diplomatic offers from Phrygia, and Kurtî himself came under pressure from Midas to renounce Neo-Assyrian suzerainty and accept that of Phrygia, likely under threat of a Phrygian attack if he refused.

===== Between Phrygia and Assyria =====
Kurtî soon rebelled against Neo-Assyrian rule and accepted the overlordship of the king Midas of Phrygia. But, Sargon II's invasion of Tabal, which had by then been reorganised as Bīt-Burutaš, and his deportation of its king, Ambaris the son of Ḫullî, convinced Kurtî to defect back to Neo-Assyrian overlordship, and he sent envoys to Sargon II in Media to re-pledge his allegiance and pay tribute to the Neo-Assyrian Empire. Sargon II pardoned Kurtî, likely because Neo-Assyrian power in northwestern Tabal was too weak to enable any action against Kurtî.

===== Regained independence and rise =====
Meanwhile, the power vacuum created in the Tabalian region by the removal of Wasusarmas of Tabal and Kiyakiyas of Šinuḫtu further intensified due to Sargon II's failure to put in place reliable vassals there and the consequent deportation of Ambaris of Bīt-Burutaš: this power vacuum in turn led to the further growth of the power of the kingdom of Atuna. And, around c. 710 BCE, Atuna and the nearby Tabalian state of Ištuanda jointly attacked and occupied some of the cities of Bīt-Burutaš which Sargon II had handed over to his loyal vassal, the king Warpalawas II of Tuwana. It is unknown whether Kurtî was still the king of Atuna by then.

The scholar Mark Weeden has suggested that Kurtî of Atuna might possibly have been identical with Gurdî of Kulummu who killed Sargon II in battle in 705 BCE, although there is no evidence to confirm or deny this identification.

== List of rulers ==
- ᵐAšḫiti (𒁹𒀾𒄭𒋾) or ᵐUšḫitti (𒁹𒍑𒄭𒀉𒋾 and 𒁹𒍑𒄭𒋾), r. c. 740 BCE
- Asḫwisis (Hieroglyphic Luwian: 𔐓𔗔𔘰𔓉𔗆; possibly identical with Ušḫitti/Ašḫiti), r. c. 730 BCE
- ᵐKurtî (𒁹𒆳𒋾𒄿; Hieroglyphic Luwian: 𔗜𔖱𔑣𔓯𔗦, romanized: Kurdis), r. c. 718 BCE

== Sources ==
- Aro, Sanna (2013). "Tabal". In Streck, Michael P. [in German]; Frantz-Szabó, Gabriella; Krebernik, Manfred [in German]; Bonacossi, D. Morandi; Postgate, J. N.; Seidl, Ursula [in German]; Stol, M.; Wilhelm, Gernot [in German] (eds.). Reallexikon der Assyriologie und Vorderasiatischen Archäologie [Encyclopaedia of Ancient Near Eastern Studies] (in German). Vol. 13. Berlin, Germany; New York City, United States: Walter de Gruyter. pp. 388–391. ISBN 978-3-110-30715-3.
- Aro, Sanna (2023). "Vanishing kingdoms: Tabal and Tuwana during the seventh century BC". In Draycott, Catherine M.; Branting, Scott; Lehner, Joseph W.; Özarslan, Yasemin (eds.). From Midas to Cyrus and Other Stories: Papers on Iron Age Anatolia in Honour of Geoffrey and Françoise Summers. BIAA Monograph Series. London, United Kingdom: British Institute at Ankara. pp. 113–135. ISBN 978-1-912-09011-2.
- Baker, Heather D. (2023). "The Assyrian Empire: A View from Within". In Radner, Karen; Moeller, Nadine; Potts, Daniel T. (eds.). The Age of Assyria. The Oxford History of the Ancient Near East. Vol. 4. New York City, United States: Oxford University Press. pp. 257–351. ISBN 978-0-190-68763-2.
- Bryce, Trevor (2009). The Routledge Handbook of the Peoples and Places of Ancient Western Asia: From the Early Bronze Age to the Fall of the Persian Empire. London, England: Routledge. ISBN 978-0-415-39485-7.
- Bryce, Trevor (2012). The World of The Neo-Hittite Kingdoms: A Political and Military History. Oxford, United Kingdom: Oxford University Press. ISBN 978-0-199-21872-1.
- Fuchs, A. (2016). "Ušḫitti". In Streck, Michael P. [in German]; Frantz-Szabó, Gabriella; Krebernik, Manfred [in German]; Bonacossi, D. Morandi; Postgate, J. N.; Seidl, Ursula [in German]; Stol, M.; Wilhelm, Gernot [in German] (eds.). Reallexikon der Assyriologie und Vorderasiatischen Archäologie [Encyclopaedia of Ancient Near Eastern Studies] (in German). Vol. 14. Berlin, Germany; New York City, United States: Walter de Gruyter. p. 506. ISBN 978-3-110-41761-6.
- Hawkins, John David [in German] (2000b). Inscriptions of the Iron Age, Part 2: Text: Amuq, Aleppo, Hama, Tabal, Assur Letters, Miscellaneous, Seals, Indices. Corpus of Hieroglyphic Luwian Inscriptions. Vol. 1. Berlin, Germany; New York City, United States: Walter de Gruyter. ISBN 978-3-110-10864-4.
- Hawkins, John David [in German] (2000c). Inscriptions of the Iron Age, Part 3: Plates. Corpus of Hieroglyphic Luwian Inscriptions. Vol. 1. Berlin, Germany; New York City, United States: Walter de Gruyter. ISBN 978-3-110-10864-4.
- Kryszeń, A. (2023). "Adunuwa". Hittite Toponyms. University of Mainz; University of Würzburg.
- Obrador-Cursach, Bartomeu (2019). "Γορδίας and Γόρδιον: a remark on Phrygian onomastics and ethnics". Journal of Indo-European Studies. 47 (3–4): 545–552.
- Payne, Annick (2023). "The Kingdom of Phrygia". In Radner, Karen; Moeller, Nadine; Potts, Daniel T. (eds.). The Age of Assyria. The Oxford History of the Ancient Near East. Vol. 4. New York City, United States: Oxford University Press. pp. 865–911. ISBN 978-0-190-68763-2.
- Simon, Zsolt (2013). "Überlegungen zu Masaurhisas, einem König aus Tabal, und der Herrscherliste von Tuwana" [Reflections on Masaurhisas, a king from Tabal, and the king-list of Tuwana]. Anatolica. 39: 277–296. doi:10.2143/ANA.39.0.2990791.
- Simon, Zsolt (2017). "Kurtis: A Phrygian Name in the Neo-Hittite World". News from the Lands of the Hittites: Scientific Journal for Anatolian Research. 1: 113–118.
- Streck, M. P. [in German] (2016). "Tunni". In Streck, Michael P. [in German]; Frantz-Szabó, Gabriella; Krebernik, Manfred [in German]; Bonacossi, D. Morandi; Postgate, J. N.; Seidl, Ursula [in German]; Stol, M.; Wilhelm, Gernot [in German] (eds.). Reallexikon der Assyriologie und Vorderasiatischen Archäologie [Encyclopaedia of Ancient Near Eastern Studies]. Vol. 14. Berlin, Germany; New York City, United States: Walter de Gruyter. pp. 189–190. ISBN 978-3-110-41761-6.
- Weeden, Mark (2010). "Tuwati and Wasusarma: Imitating the Behaviour of Assyria". Iraq. 72. British Institute for the Study of Iraq: 39–61. doi:10.1017/S0021088900000589.
- Weeden, Mark (2017). "Tabal and the Limits of Assyrian Imperialism". In Heffron, Yağmur; Stone, Adam; Worthington, Martin (eds.). At the Dawn of History: Ancient Near Eastern Studies in Honour of J. N. Postgate. Vol. 2. Winona, United States: Eisenbrauns. pp. 721–736. ISBN 978-1-57506-471-0.
- Weeden, Mark (2023). "The Iron Age States of Central Anatolia and Northern Syria". In Radner, Karen; Moeller, Nadine; Potts, Daniel T. (eds.). The Age of Assyria. The Oxford History of the Ancient Near East. Vol. 4. New York City, United States: Oxford University Press. pp. 912–1026. ISBN 978-0-190-68763-2.

== See also ==
- Ancient regions of Anatolia
