= Ištuanda =

Neo-Hittite state

𒌷𒄑𒌅𒀭𒁕 (Ištuanda)
- Early 1st millennium BCE ?–Unknown
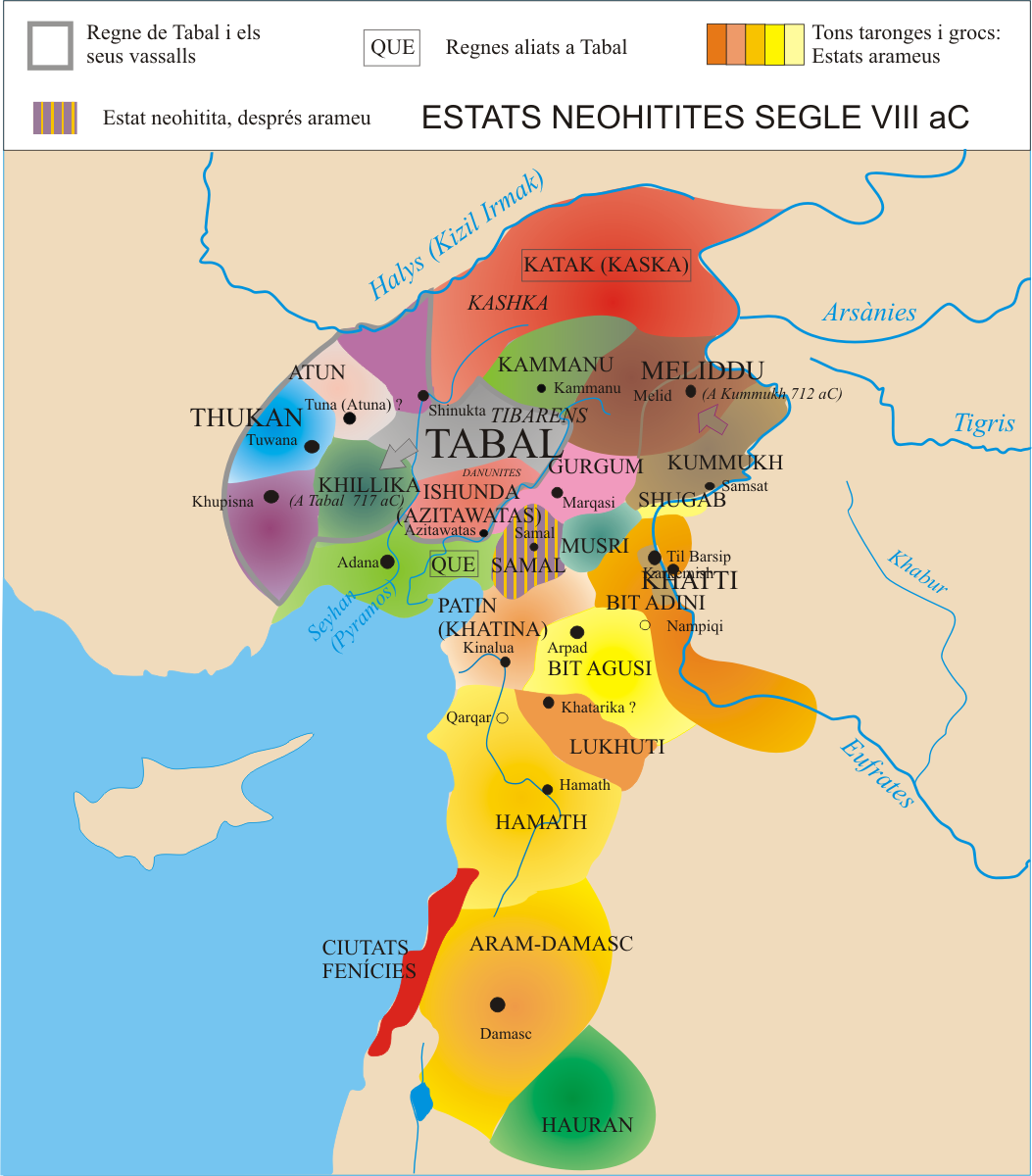
- Ištuanda among the Neo-Hittite states
- Capital: Ištuanda
- Common languages: Luwian
- Religion: Luwian religion
- Government: Monarchy
- King
  - r. c. 738 BC – c. 732 BC: Tuḫamme

Vassal of the Neo-Assyrian Empire (c. 740s - c. 710s BCE)
- Historical era: Iron Age
  - Established: Early 1st millennium BCE ?
  - Atunaean-Ištuandaean attack on Bīt-Burutaš: c. 710 BCE
  - Disestablished: Unknown
Preceded by
Hittite empire
- Today part of: Turkey

Ištuanda (Neo-Assyrian Akkadian: 𒌷𒄑𒌅𒀭𒁕) or Ištunda (Neo-Assyrian Akkadian: 𒌷𒅖𒌅𒌦𒁕) was a Luwian-speaking Neo-Hittite state which existed in the region of Tabal in southeastern Anatolia in the Iron Age.

== Geography ==
Ištuanda was located in northern Cappadocia, in the northwestern part of the Tabalian region close to the kingdom of Atuna and near what is presently Aksaray.

== History ==
=== Bronze Age ===
The territory that later became Ištuanda might have corresponded to the region which was referred to in Hittite texts from the Late Bronze Age as Wašuduwanda (𒌷𒉿𒋗𒁺𒉿𒀭𒁕), which was the site of a shrine to the goddess Ḫepat.

=== Iron Age ===
==== Kingdom of Ištuanda ====
By c. 738 BC, the Tabalian region, including Ištuanda, had become a tributary of the Neo-Assyrian king Tiglath-pileser III, possibly after his conquest of Arpad over the course of 743 to 740 BC caused the states of the Tabalian region to submit to him, or possibly as a result of a campaign of Tiglath-pileser III in Tabal.

Consequently, in 738 and 732 BCE, the king Tuḫamme of Ištuanda was one of the five rulers of the Tabalian region who paid tribute to Tiglath-pileser III.

Around c. 710 BCE, Ištuanda and the nearby Tabalian state of Atuna jointly attacked and occupied some of the cities of Bīt-Burutaš which the Neo-Assyrian king Sargon II had handed over to his loyal vassal, the king Warpalawas II of Tuwana.

== List of rulers ==
- ᵐTuḫamme (Neo-Assyrian Akkadian: 𒁹𒌅𒄩𒄠𒈨), r. c. 738 BC – c. 732 BC

== Sources ==
- Aro, Sanna (2013). "Tabal". In Streck, Michael P. [in German]; Frantz-Szabó, Gabriella; Krebernik, Manfred [in German]; Bonacossi, D. Morandi; Postgate, J. N.; Seidl, Ursula [in German]; Stol, M.; Wilhelm, Gernot [in German] (eds.). Reallexikon der Assyriologie und Vorderasiatischen Archäologie [Encyclopaedia of Ancient Near Eastern Studies] (in German). Vol. 13. Berlin, Germany; New York City, United States: Walter de Gruyter. pp. 388–391. ISBN 978-3-110-30715-3.
- Bryce, Trevor (2009). The Routledge Handbook of the Peoples and Places of Ancient Western Asia: From the Early Bronze Age to the Fall of the Persian Empire. London, England: Routledge. ISBN 978-0-415-39485-7.
- Bryce, Trevor (2012). The World of The Neo-Hittite Kingdoms: A Political and Military History. Oxford, United Kingdom: Oxford University Press. ISBN 978-0-199-21872-1.
- Kryszeń, A. (2023). "Wašuduwanta". Hittite Toponyms. University of Mainz; University of Würzburg.
- Weeden, Mark (2023). "The Iron Age States of Central Anatolia and Northern Syria". In Radner, Karen; Moeller, Nadine; Potts, Daniel T. (eds.). The Age of Assyria. The Oxford History of the Ancient Near East. Vol. 4. New York City, United States: Oxford University Press. pp. 912–1026. ISBN 978-0-190-68763-2.

== See also ==
- Ancient regions of Anatolia
