= Atuna =

Atuna may refer to:

- Atuna (plant), a genus of flowering plants from the family Chrysobalanaceae.
- Atuna (state), a Luwian-speaking Syro-Hittite petty kingdom that existed during the Iron Age.
