= Neo-Hittite states =

Iron Age states of modern Syria and Turkey

The Neo-Hittite states (colored) c. 800 BCE, with the Luwian ones predominantly in the north and the Aramean ones predominantly in the south

The states called Neo-Hittite, Syro-Hittite (in older literature), or Luwian-Aramean (in modern scholarly works) were Luwian and Aramean regional polities of the Iron Age, situated in southeastern parts of modern Turkey and northwestern parts of modern Syria, known in ancient times as lands of Hatti and Aram. They arose following the collapse of the Hittite New Kingdom in the 12th century BCE, and lasted until they were subdued by the Assyrian Empire in the 8th century BCE. They are grouped together by scholars on the basis of several cultural criteria that are recognized as similar and shared between both societies: northern (Luwian) and southern (Aramean). Cultural exchange between those societies is seen as a specific regional phenomenon, particularly in light of significant linguistic distinctions between the two main regional languages, with Luwian belonging to the Anatolian group of Indo-European languages and Aramaic belonging to the Northwest Semitic group of Semitic languages. Several questions related to the regional grouping of Luwian and Aramaean states are viewed differently among scholars, including some views that are critical towards such grouping in general.

== Name ==
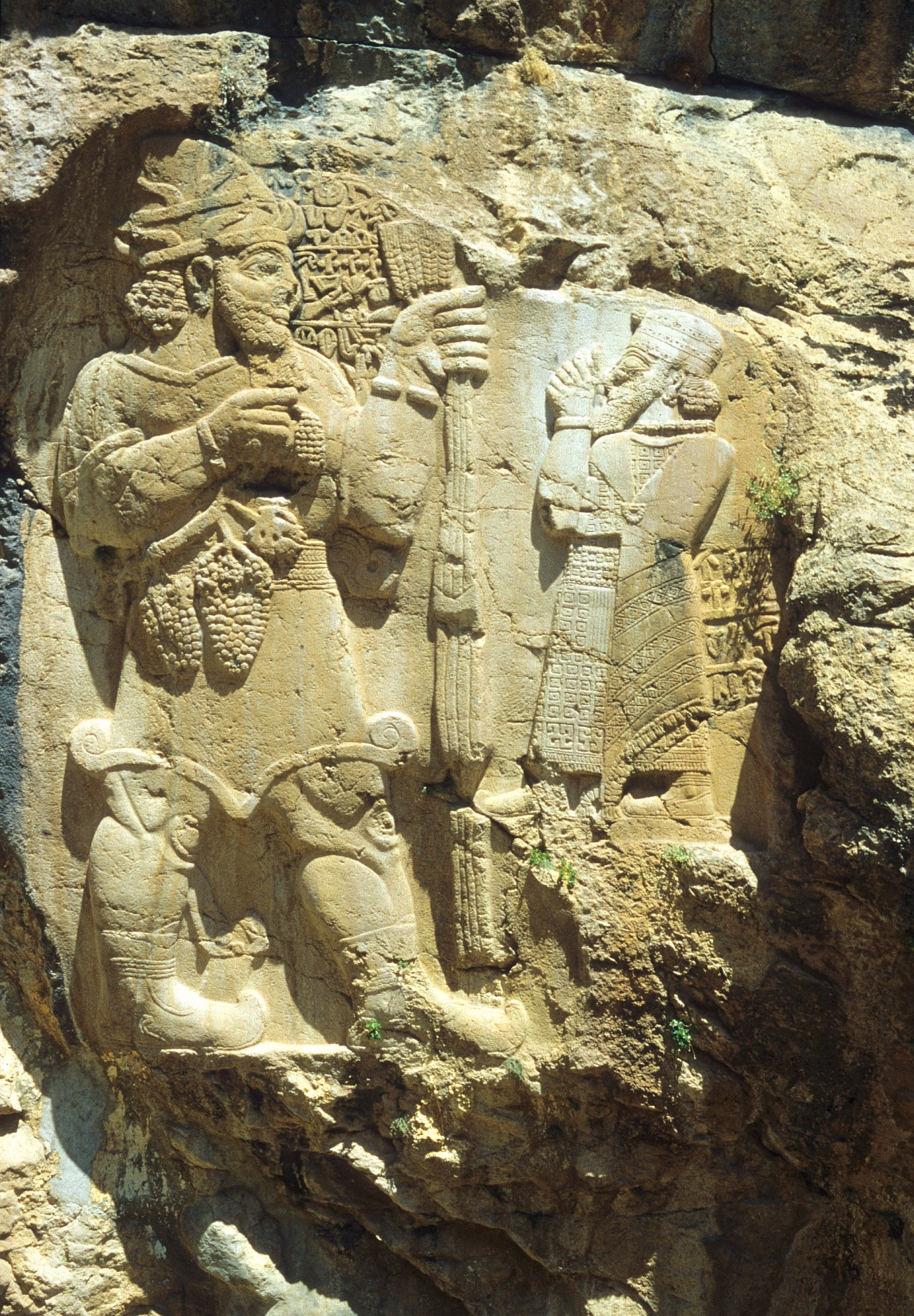
İvriz relief, with God Teshub (on the left) and king Warpalawas (ca 730-710 BCE) (right)

One of the most contested issues among scholars within the field is related to the choice of the qualifier for this group of states.

=== Neo-Hittite states ===
The most commonly used qualifier for these states is Neo-Hittite. It has been criticized because it can mislead readers into thinking these states were ethno-linguistically Hittite, even though the Hittite language is not attested in them.

However, Mirko Novák notes that

the qualifier "Neo-Hittite", culturally connoted, seems however the most suitable here—alongside "Luwo-Aramean", more appropriate from a linguistic point of view—insofar as the sovereigns of these principalities express in their titulature and in the iconography a feeling of identity that attaches itself deliberately to the tradition of the Hittite Empire.

According to Novák,

The term „Neo-Hittite“ reflects on the inherited elements from the Hittite imperial period, such as the iconography of kings and gods in the visual art or the titularity of the kings. This ideological tradition constructed by the “Neo-Hittite” entities effected the Assyrian designation of the Northern Levant as “Land of Ḫatti”.

=== Luwian-Aramean states ===
Some scholars have been using Luwian-Aramean and variations thereof (e.g. Aramean-Luwian, Luwo-Aramaean, Luwio-Aramean) which are derived from endonymic (native) names for Luwians and Arameans. According to Novák, Luwo-Aramean is more appropriate than Neo-Hittite from a linguistic standpoint, "since Aramaic and Hieroglyphic Luwian were the predominant languages spoken and written." However, quoting Novák,

Factually, both terms “Neo-Hittite” and “Luwo-Aramaean” describe one and the same region and culture.

=== Others ===
The labels Syrian-Anatolian or Syro-Anatolian have been criticized for using exonymic (foreign) names, based on the Greek term Anatolia, combined with an anachronistic application of the term Syria, in the sense that was introduced much later, by ancient Greeks, as their designation for Arameans and their land, Aram. Such preference for foreign terms, advocated by some western scholars, is viewed as being culturally biased, and thus insensitive towards native (endonymic) terminology. Anachronistic uses of Syria in modern scholarly literature were additionally challenged after the recent discovery of the bilingual Çineköy inscription from the 8th century BCE, written in the Luwian and Phoenician languages. The inscription contained references to the neighbouring Assyria, inscribed in a specific form that renders as Syria, thus providing additional (and in the same time the oldest) evidence for the dominant scholarly view on the origins and primary meanings of the term Syria, that originated as an apheretic form of the term Assyria, and was redefined much later, by ancient Greeks, who introduced a territorial distinction between two names, and started to use term Syria as a specific designation for western regions (ancient Aram). For ancient Luwians, Syria was designation for Assyria proper, thus revealing the later Greek use of the term Syria as very different from its original meaning, and also anachronistic if used in modern scientific descriptions of historical realities, related to Luwian and Aramean states of the Iron Age.

The qualifier Syro-Hittite has been criticized as well for anachronistically using the prefix Syro-, but also on the grounds that it overemphasizes the "Syrian" (i.e. Aramean) aspect while neglecting the Luwian one.

The term post-Hittite states has also been proposed, although it is by definition too broad, as it can be used and has been used in reference to other Iron Age polities that flourished after the collapse of the Hittite Empire, from the 12th to the 6th century BCE, such as Phrygia or even the Neo-Assyrian Empire.

== Late Bronze Age – Early Iron Age transition ==
The Hittite New Kingdom and its zone of influence (political and cultural) during the 14th and the 13th centuries BCE

The collapse of the Hittite New Kingdom is usually associated with the gradual decline of Eastern Mediterranean trade networks and the resulting collapse of major Late Bronze Age cities in the Levant, Anatolia and the Aegean. At the beginning of the 12th century BCE, Wilusa (Troy) was destroyed and the Hittite New Kingdom suffered a sudden devastating attack from the Kaskas, who occupied the coasts around the Black Sea, and who joined with the Mysians. They proceeded to destroy almost all Hittite sites but were finally defeated by the Assyrians beyond the southern borders near the Tigris. Hatti, Arzawa (Lydia), Alashiya (Cyprus), Ugarit and Alalakh were destroyed.

Hattusa, the Hittite capital, was completely destroyed. Following this collapse of large cities and the Hittite state, the Early Iron Age in northern Mesopotamia saw a dispersal of settlements and ruralization, with the appearance of large numbers of hamlets, villages, and farmsteads. Syro-Hittite states emerged in the process of such major landscape transformation, in the form of regional states with new political structures and cultural affiliations. David Hawkins was able to trace a dynastic link between the Hittite imperial dynasty and the "Great Kings" and "Country-lords" of Melid and Karkamish of the Early Iron Age, proving an uninterrupted continuity between the Late Bronze Age and the Early Iron Age at those sites.

Aside from literary evidence from inscriptions, the uninterrupted cultural continuity of Post-Hittite states in the region, during the transitional period between the Late Bronze Age and the Early Iron Age, is now further confirmed by recent archaeological work at the Temple of the Storm God on the citadel of Aleppo, and Ain Dara temple, where the Late Bronze Age temple buildings continue into the Iron Age without hiatus, with repeated periods of construction in the Early Iron Age.

== List of Neo-Hittite states ==
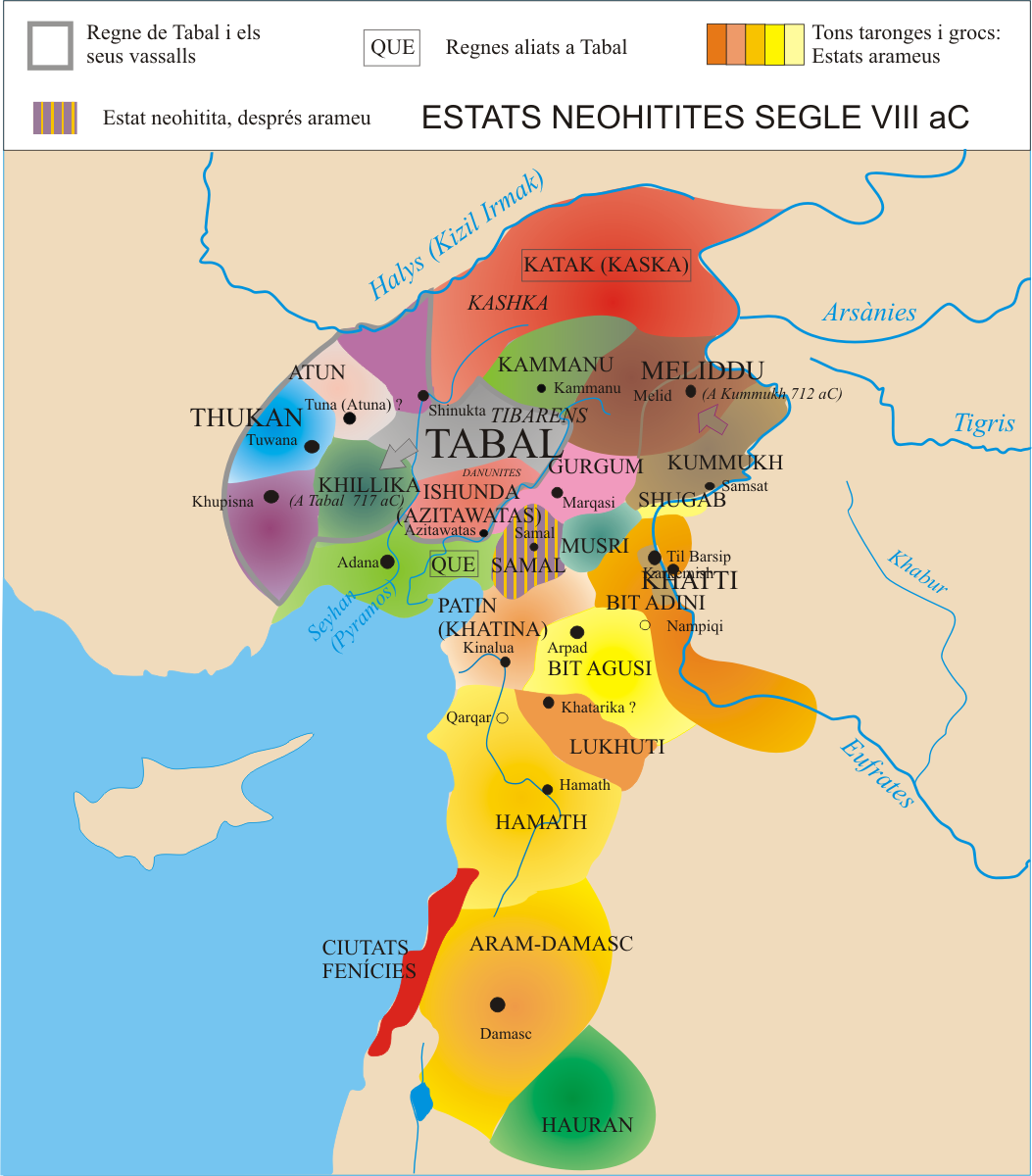
Various Luwian and Aramean (orange shades) states in the 8th century BCE

The Neo-Hittite states may be divided into two groups: a northern group where Hittite rulers remained in power, and a southern group where Arameans came to rule from about 1000 BCE. These states were highly decentralised structures; some appear to have been only loose confederations of sub-kingdoms.

The northern group includes:

- the Tabalian region, which included:
  - Tabal proper,
  - Tuwana,
  - Atuna,
  - Ḫubišna,
  - Šinuḫtu,
  - Ištuanda;
- Kammanu (with Melid)
- Ḫilakku
- Ḫiyawa (with a stronghold at modern Karatepe)
- Gurgum
- Kummuh
- Carchemish

The southern group includes:

- Palistin (whose capital was probably Tell Tayinat)
- Bit Gabbari (with Sam'al)
- Bit-Adini (with the city of Til Barsip)
- Bit Bahiani (with Guzana)
- Pattin (also Pattina or Unqi) (with the city of Kinalua, maybe modern Tell Tayinat)
- Ain Dara, a religious center
- Bit Agusi (with the cities of Arpad, Nampigi, and (later on) Aleppo)
- Hatarikka-Luhuti (the capital city of which was at Hatarikka)
- Hamath

== Inscriptions ==
Luwian monumental inscriptions in Anatolian hieroglyphs continue almost uninterrupted from the 13th-century Hittite imperial monuments to the Early Iron Age Syro-Hittite inscriptions of Karkemish, Melid, Aleppo and elsewhere. Luwian hieroglyphs were chosen by many of the Syro-Hittite regional kingdoms for their monumental inscriptions, which often appear in bi- or tri-lingual inscriptions with Aramaic, Phoenician or Akkadian versions. The Early Iron Age in Northern Mesopotamia also saw a gradual spread of alphabetic writing in Aramaic and Phoenician. During the cultural interactions on the Levantine coast of Syro-Palestine and North Syria in the 10th through 8th centuries BCE, Greeks and Phrygians adopted the alphabetic writing from the Phoenicians.

== See also ==
- List of Neo-Hittite kings
- Iron Age Anatolia
- Iron Age Levant
- Euphrates Handmade Syrian Horses and Riders
- Euphrates Syrian Pillar Figurines
- Sakçagözü
- Stele of Zakkur
- Tarḫuntašša

== Sources ==
- Amadasi-Guzzo, Maria Giulia (2019). "What Do We Know about the Borders and Exchanges between Aram and Phoenicia in the 9th–8th Centuries B.C.E. in Anatolia and Syria?". Aramaean Borders: Defining Aramaean Territories in the 10th–8th Centuries B.C.E. Leiden-Boston: Brill. pp. 149–171. ISBN 9789004398535.
- Bagg, Ariel M. (2019). "At the Limits of Historical Geography: Reconstructing Aramaean Territories in the West According to the Neo-Assyrian Written Sources". Aramaean Borders: Defining Aramaean Territories in the 10th–8th Centuries B.C.E. Leiden-Boston: Brill. pp. 1–25. ISBN 9789004398535.
- Bryce, Trevor R. (2012). The World of The Neo-Hittite Kingdoms: A Political and Military History. New York: Oxford University Press. ISBN 9780191505027.
- Dušek, Jan (2019). "The Kingdom of Arpad/Bīt-Agūsi: Its Capital, and Its Borders". Aramaean Borders: Defining Aramaean Territories in the 10th–8th Centuries B.C.E. Leiden-Boston: Brill. pp. 172–202. ISBN 9789004398535.
- Edmonds, Alexander J. (2019). "A People without Borders? Tracing the Shifting Identities and Territorialities of the Ahlameans". Aramaean Borders: Defining Aramaean Territories in the 10th–8th Centuries B.C.E. Leiden-Boston: Brill. pp. 26–62. ISBN 9789004398535.
- Gilibert, Alessandra (2011). Syro-Hittite Monumental Art and the Archaeology of Performance: The Stone Reliefs at Carchemish and Zincirli in the Earlier First Millennium BCE. Berlin-New York: Walter de Gruyter. ISBN 9783110222258.
- Gurney, Oliver R. (1954) [1952]. The Hittites (2nd revised ed.). Harmondsworth: Penguin Books.
- Gzella, Holger (2015). A Cultural History of Aramaic: From the Beginnings to the Advent of Islam. Leiden-Boston: Brill. ISBN 9789004285101.
- Greenfield, Jonas C. (1998). "Arameans and Aramaic in Anatolia". XXXIVème Rencontre assyriologique internationale. Ankara: Türk Tarih Kurumu Basımevi. pp. 199–207.
- Hawkins, John David (1982). "The Neo-Hittite States in Syria and Anatolia". The Cambridge Ancient History. Vol. 3. Cambridge: Cambridge University Press. pp. 372–441. ISBN 9780521224963.
- Hawkins, John David (1986). "Writing in Anatolia: Imported and Indigenous Systems". World Archaeology. 17 (3): 363–376. doi:10.1080/00438243.1986.9979976. JSTOR 124701.
- Hawkins, John David (1994). "The end of the Bronze age in Anatolia: New Light from Recent Discoveries". Anatolian Iron Ages. Vol. 3. London-Ankara: British Institute of Archeology at Ankara. pp. 91–94. ISBN 9781912090693.
- Hawkins, John David (1995a). "Karkamish and Karatepe: Neo-Hittite City-States in North Syria". Civilizations of the Ancient Near East. Vol. 2. New York: Simon & Schuster Macmillan. pp. 1295–1307. ISBN 9780684197210.
- Hawkins, John David (1995b). "Great Kings and Country Lords at Malatya and Karkamiš". Studio Historiae Ardens: Ancient Near Eastern Studies. Istanbul: Nederlands Historisch-Archaeologisch Instituut te Istanbul. pp. 75–86. ISBN 9789062580750.
- Hawkins, John David (1995c). "The Political Geography of North Syria and South-East Anatolia in the Neo-Assyrian Period". Neo-Assyrian Geography. Roma: Università di Roma. pp. 87–101.
- Lipiński, Edward (2000). The Aramaeans: Their Ancient History, Culture, Religion. Leuven: Peeters Publishers. ISBN 9789042908598.
- Lipiński, Edward (2013). "The Aramaeans in the West (13th–8th centuries)". Arameans, Chaldeans, and Arabs in Babylonia and Palestine in the First Millennium B.C. Wiesbaden: Harrassowitz Verlag. pp. 123–147. ISBN 9783447065443.
- Messo, Johny (2011). "The Origin of the Terms Syria(n) and Suryoyo: Once Again". Parole de l'Orient. 36: 111–125.
- Novák, Mirko (2018). "Elites behind Walls: Citadels and the Segregation of Elites in Anatolia, the Levant and Mesopotamia" (PDF). In Ünsal, Yalçın (ed.). Anatolian metal VIII: Eliten - Handwerk - Prestigegüter.
- Novák, Mirko (2019). "Histoire des principautés néo-hittites (louvito-araméennes)" (PDF). In Blanchard, Vincent (ed.). Royaumes oubliés de l'empire hittite aux araméens (in French).
- Osborne, James F. (2012). "Communicating Power in the Bīt-Ḫilāni Palace". Bulletin of the American Schools of Oriental Research. 368: 29–66. doi:10.5615/bullamerschoorie.368.0029. S2CID 156406413.
- Osborne, James F. (2014). "Settlement Planning and Urban Symbology in Syro-Anatolian Cities". Cambridge Archaeological Journal. 24 (2): 195–214. doi:10.1017/S0959774314000444.
- Osborne, James F. (2017). "Exploring the Lower Settlements of Iron Age Capitals in Anatolia and Syria". Antiquity. 91 (355): 90–107. doi:10.15184/aqy.2016.254. S2CID 164449885.
- Osborne, James F. (2020). The Syro-Anatolian City-States: An Iron Age Culture. New York: Oxford University Press. ISBN 9780199315833.
- Richelle, Matthieu (2019). "The Fluctuating Borders of Hamath (10th–8th Centuries B.C.E.)". Aramaean Borders: Defining Aramaean Territories in the 10th–8th Centuries B.C.E. Leiden-Boston: Brill. pp. 203–228. ISBN 9789004398535.
- Rollinger, Robert (2006a). "Assyrios, Syrios, Syros und Leukosyros". Die Welt des Orients. 36: 72–82. JSTOR 25684050.
- Rollinger, Robert (2006b). "The Terms Assyria and Syria Again" (PDF). Journal of Near Eastern Studies. 65 (4): 283–287. doi:10.1086/511103. S2CID 162760021.
- Sader, Hélène (2000). "The Aramaean Kingdoms of Syria: Origin and Formation Processes". Essays on Syria in the Iron Age. Louvain: Peeters Press. pp. 61–76. ISBN 9789042908789.
- Sader, Hélène (2010). "The Aramaeans of Syria: Some Considerations on their Origin and Material Culture". The Books of Kings: Sources, Composition, Historiography and Reception. Leiden-Boston: Brill. pp. 273–300. ISBN 978-9004177291.
- Sader, Hélène (2014). "History". The Aramaeans in Ancient Syria. Leiden: Brill. pp. 11–36. ISBN 9789004229433.
- Sader, Hélène (2016). "The Formation and Decline of the Aramaean States in Iron Age Syria". State Formation and State Decline in the Near and Middle East. Wiesbaden: Harrassowitz Verlag. pp. 61–76. ISBN 9783447105651.
- Simon, Zsolt (2019). "Aramaean Borders: the Hieroglyphic Luwian Evidence". Aramaean Borders: Defining Aramaean Territories in the 10th–8th Centuries B.C.E. Leiden-Boston: Brill. pp. 125–148. ISBN 9789004398535.
- Weeden, Mark; Ullmann, Lee Z. (2022). Hittite Landscape and Geography. Brill. ISBN 978-90-04-34939-1.
- Younger, Kenneth Lawson (2016). A Political History of the Arameans: From Their Origins to the End of Their Polities. Atlanta: SBL Press. ISBN 9781628370843.
