= Bahija Khalil Ismail =

Iraqi Assyriologist (1934–2019)

- Born: بهيجة خليل إسماعيل الجراح; 1934; Baghdad, Kingdom of Iraq
- Died: January 13, 2019 (aged 84–85); Amman, Jordan
- Occupation: Museum director

Bahija Khalil (1934 – January 13, 2019) was an Iraqi Assyriologist and director of the Iraq Museum from 1983 to 1989. She was the first woman director of the museum.

== Biography ==
Khalil was born in Baghdad in 1934. She obtained her first degree in archaeology at the University of Baghdad. She studied further in Germany where she gained her Ph.D from Humboldt University after studying cuneiform writing in 1967. She became the first Iraqi archaeologist reading the scripts in Iraq and the first Iraqi student to obtain a doctorate in Archaeology from Germany. She carried out post-doctoral research at the University of Baghdad. Khalil died in Amman in 2019.

== Museum directorship ==
She became the director of the Iraqi Museum in 1983. She was first woman director and she held that role until 1989. Her position was a matter of pride in Iraq where her appointment was seen as a first in the Arab world.

== Academic career ==
She and Nicolas Postgate published "Texts in the Iraq Museum: Texts from Niniveh" in 1994.

She published Eine zweisprachige Hymne aus dem Haus des Beschwörungspriesters in 1998 in German. This concerns a hymn that is in two different languages.

== Published works ==
- Mittelassyrische Keilschrifttexte aus Assurien, 1967
- Eine zweisprachige Hymne aus dem Haus des Beschwörungspriesters, 1998
- Obelisk of Hammurabi (1980).
- The role of Assyrian colonies in Anatolia, (1981)
- Medicine: Its Role and Status in the Civilization of Iraq, (1989)
- Sokho and Mary Rulers (1990)
- Writings from Nineveh (1992)
