= Journal of Cuneiform Studies =

- Discipline: Assyriology
- Language: English, French, German
- Edited by: Paul Delnero, Petra Goedegebuure, Seth Richardson

Publication details
- History: 1947-present
- Publisher: University of Chicago Press for the American Society of Overseas Research (United States)
- Frequency: Annually

Standard abbreviations
- ISO 4: J. Cuneif. Stud.

Indexing
- ISSN: 0022-0256
- LCCN: 51032477
- JSTOR: 00220256
- OCLC no.: 1782513

Links
- Journal homepage

The Journal of Cuneiform Studies was founded in 1947 by the Baghdad School of the American Society of Overseas Research. The journal presents articles about ancient Mesopotamian language and history in English, French and German.
