= Eisenbrauns =

- Founded: 1975
- Founder: Jim and Merna Eisenbraun
- Country of origin: United States
- Headquarters location: University Park, Pennsylvania
- Publication types: Books, Academic journals
- Nonfiction topics: ancient Near East and biblical studies
- Official website: www.eisenbrauns.org

Eisenbrauns, an imprint of Penn State University Press, is an academic publisher specializing in the ancient Near East and biblical studies. They publish approximately twenty new books and reference works each year, as well as reprinting out-of-print books relating to biblical studies.

Eisenbrauns was founded by Jim and Merna Eisenbraun in 1975 in Ann Arbor, Michigan. Jim, a graduate at Ann Arbor, was tired of paying high prices for specialized books. He paid the legal fee to operate a bookstore and gained access to retailers' prices. The store quickly gained traction and moved to a 4,000 square feet building in 1978. It operated for over forty years in Winona Lake, Indiana, and Warsaw, Indiana before its acquisition by Penn State University Press in 2017.
