= Martin Worthington (academic) =

Associate professor based at Trinity College in Dublin, Ireland

Martin John Vittorio Worthington is Professore Ordinario of Assyriology in the Dipartimento di Civiltá e Forme del Sapere of the University of Pisa. He was formerly Associate Professor in Middle Eastern Studies at the Al Maktoum Centre for Middle Eastern Studies in the Department of Near and Middle Eastern Studies, Trinity College, Dublin, senior lecturer in Assyriology at the University of Cambridge, and British Academy Research Fellow in the Dept of Near and Middle East at SOAS, University of London, with his research focused on Babylonian poems from the first millennium BC. From 2006 to 2010 Worthington was a junior research fellow in Assyriology at St John's College, Cambridge. In 2011 Worthington was awarded the Sir George Staunton Prize from the Royal Asiatic Society, and in 2025 the Gold Medal of Ivane Javakhishvili Tbilisi State University. In 2018 he directed the world’s first Babylonian-language film, The Poor Man of Nippur, which was shortlisted by the Arts and Humanities Research Council for the 2019 ‘Research in Film’ award.

Worthington worked with Marvel for the movie The Eternals, by providing them translations and recordings for part of the script in Babylonian.

== Selected publications ==
- Worthington, Martin (2010), Teach yourself complete Babylonian, London Teach Yourself Books, ISBN 978-0340983881
- Worthington, Martin (2011), "On Names and Artistic Unity in the Standard Version of the Babylonian Gilgamesh Epic", Journal of the Royal Asiatic Society, 21 (4), Journal of the Royal Asiatic Society, v21 n04: 403–420, doi:10.1017/S1356186311000423, ISSN 1356-1863, S2CID 162366795
- Worthington, Martin (2012), Principles of Akkadian textual criticism, Studies in ancient Near Eastern records, v. 1., De Gruyter, ISBN 9781283629256
- Worthington, Martin (2019), Ea's Duplicity in the Gilgamesh Flood Story, Routledge, ISBN 9781138388925
- Worthington, Martin; Chetwood, Mark K. (2027), The Cambridge Introduction to Sumerian, Cambridge University Press, ISBN 978-1009574082
