= Nicholas Postgate (academic) =

British academic and Assyriologist (born 1945)

Professor Nicholas Postgate FBA
- Born: John Nicholas Postgate; 5 November 1945 (age 80)

Academic background
- Education: Winchester College
- Alma mater: Trinity College, Cambridge

Academic work
- Discipline: Ancient Near East
- Institutions: SOAS, University of London; University of Cambridge; Trinity College, Cambridge; British School of Archaeology in Iraq
- Notable students: Wendy Matthews

John Nicholas Postgate, FBA (born 5 November 1945) is a British academic and Assyriologist. From 1975 to 1980, he was Director of the British School of Archaeology in Iraq. From 1994 to 2013, he was Professor of Assyriology at the University of Cambridge. He is a Fellow of Trinity College, Cambridge.

== Early life ==
Postgate was born on 5 November 1945. He is a member of the Postgate family. He was educated at Winchester College, a boys public school in Winchester, Hampshire, between 1959 and 1963. He was a Collegeman, meaning he was a recipient of a scholarship. He studied at Trinity College, Cambridge, and graduated from the University of Cambridge with a Bachelor of Arts (BA) degree.

== Academic career ==
Postgate began his academic career as an assistant lecturer in Akkadian at the SOAS, University of London from 1967 to 1971. He then returned to the University of Cambridge, his alma mater, as a fellow of Trinity College from 1970 to 1974. From 1972 to 1975, he was also deputy-director of the British School of Archaeology in Iraq. He was promoted in 1975, and served in the full-time role of Director from 1975 to 1980.

In 1982, he returned to the University of Cambridge and once more became a fellow of Trinity College, Cambridge. From 1982 to 1985, he was a university lecturer in the history and archaeology of the Ancient Near East. He was promoted to Reader in Mesopotamian studies in 1985. He was promoted to Professor of Assyriology in 1994.

He undertook excavations at Abu Salabikh, a Sumerian city in Iraq, from 1975 to 1989. Postgate and Bahija Khalil, director of the Iraq Museum, published "Texts in the Iraq Museum: Texts from Niniveh" in 1994. From 1994 to 2013, he was the director of excavations at Kilise Tepe, a Bronze and Iron Age site in Turkey.

Postgate retired from full-time academia in 2013.

== Personal life ==
Postgate married Carolyn Prater in 1968, with whom he had two children. Their marriage was dissolved in 1999. He remarried to Sarah Blakeney in 1999. They had three children.

== Honours ==
Postgate was elected Fellow of the British Academy (FBA) in 1993.

== Books ==
- Neo-Assyrian Royal Grants and Decrees. Studia Pohl, Series Maior 1. Rome: Pontifical Biblical Institute. 1969.
- The Governor’s Palace Archive. Cuneiform Texts from Nimrud II. London: British School of Archaeology in Iraq. 1973.
- Taxation and Conscription in the Assyrian Empire. Studia Pohl, Series Maior 3. Rome: Pontifical Biblical Institute. 1974.
- Fifty Neo-Assyrian Legal Documents. Warminster: Aris & Phillips. 1976.
- The Archive of Urad-Serua and His Family: A Middle Assyrian Household in Government Service. Rome: Herder. 1988.
- Early Mesopotamia: Society and Economy at the Dawn of History. London-New York: Routledge. 1992.
- The Land Assur and the Yoke of Assur: Studies on Assyria 1971–2005. Cambridge: Cambridge University Press. 2007.
- The Languages of Iraq: Ancient and Modern. London: British School of Archaeology in Iraq. 2007.
- Bronze Age Bureaucracy: Writing and the Practice of Government in Assyria. Oxford: Oxbow. 2013.
