= Trevor R. Bryce =

Australian Hittitologist (born 1940)

Trevor Bryce
- Born: 1940 (age 85–86)
- Education: University of Queensland (UQ)
- Occupations: Historian, author, lecturer, and professor
- Known for: Hittitology and Near Eastern history
- Children: 2
- Awards: Centenary Medal, 2001; Doctor of Letters (D. Litt.), UQ, 2010

Trevor Robert Bryce (/braɪs/; born 1940) is an Australian Hittitologist specializing in ancient and classical Near-eastern history. He is semi-retired and lives in Brisbane.

His book, The Kingdom of the Hittites, is popular among English-speaking readers since the study of the Hittites has been dominated by German-language scholarship. A new improved and updated edition of this popular book, featuring 90 additional pages, was published in 2005. Bryce is a professor in the School of History, Philosophy, Religion, and Classics at The University of Queensland.

== Family ==
He has two children and five grandchildren.

== Awards and professional elections ==
- 1989 Fellow, Australian Academy of the Humanities
- 2001 Centenary Medal
- 2010 Doctor of Letters, University of Queensland

== Selected publications ==
- Bryce, Trevor (1983). The Major Historical Texts of Early Hittite History. St Lucia, Queensland: University of Queensland. p. 178. ISBN 9780867761221. OCLC 27112912.
- Bryce, Trevor (1986). The Parting Mists of Ancient Anatolia. Armidale, New South Wales: University of New England. p. 28. ISBN 9780858346093. OCLC 29017190.
- Bryce, Trevor; Jan Zahle (1986). The Lycians: A Study of Lycian History and Civilisation to the Conquest of Alexander the Great. Copenhagen: Museum Tusculanum Press. ISBN 9788772890234. OCLC 15541012. — Planned as a two-volume project, only Volume 1 has been published: Bryce, Trevor (1986). The Lycians in Literary and Epigraphic Sources. Vol. 1. Copenhagen: Museum Tusculanum Press. p. 273. ISBN 9788772890234. OCLC 19846329.
- Bryce, Trevor (1999). The Kingdom of the Hittites. Oxford: Oxford University Press. ISBN 9780199240104. OCLC 264593433.
- Bryce, Trevor (2002). Life and Society in the Hittite World. Oxford: Oxford University Press. p. 312. ISBN 9780199241705. OCLC 49518946.
- Bryce, Trevor (2003). Letters of the Great Kings of the Ancient Near East: The Royal Correspondence of the late Bronze Age (PDF). London: Routledge. p. 253. ISBN 9780415258579. OCLC 52159937.
- Bryce, Trevor (2006). The Trojans and their Neighbours. London: Routledge. pp. 225. ISBN 9780203695340. OCLC 68709825. "Trevor Bryce."
- Bryce, Trevor, The ‘Eternal Treaty’ from the Hittite perspective, British Museum Studies in Ancient Egypt and Sudan (BMSAES) Issue 6, 2006, pp.1-11 PDF
- Bryce, Trevor; Adam Hook (2007). Hittite Warrior. Oxford: Osprey Publishing. p. 64. ISBN 9781846030819. OCLC 137222181.
- Bryce, Trevor; et al. (2009). The Routledge Handbook of the Peoples and Places of Ancient Western Asia: From the Early Bronze Age to the Fall of the Persian Empire. London: Routledge. p. 887. ISBN 9780415394857. OCLC 289096010.
- Bryce, Trevor (2012). The World of the Neo-Hittite Kingdoms: A Political and Military History. Oxford: Oxford University Press. p. 356. ISBN 9780199218721. OCLC 757930804.
- Bryce, Trevor; Jessie Birkett-Rees (2016). Atlas of the Ancient Near East: From Prehistoric Times to the Roman Imperial Period. London: Routledge. p. 336. ISBN 9780415508018.
- Bryce, Trevor (2016). Babylonia: A Very Short Introduction. Oxford: Oxford University Press. p. 143. ISBN 9780198726470. OCLC 757930804.
- Bryce, Trevor, The Kingdom of Ahhiyawa: A Hittite Perspective, SMEA NS 4, 2018, pp.191-230 PDF
- Bryce, Trevor (2019). Warriors of Anatolia: A Concise History of the Hittites. London: Bloomsbury Academic. p. 300. ISBN 9781350140783. OCLC 49518946.

== See also ==
- Horizon - Bryce's work was also highlighted in the March 2004 episode "The Truth of Troy".
