= Ḫiyawa =

Luwian-speaking Neo-Hittite state

𔗒𔓱𔗬𔔂 (Ḫiyawa) 𔐓𔗢𔗬𔔂 (Adanawa) 𒆳𒄣𒂊 (Que) 𒆳𒄷𒈨𒂊 (Ḫuwê)
- c. 12th century BC–8th century BC
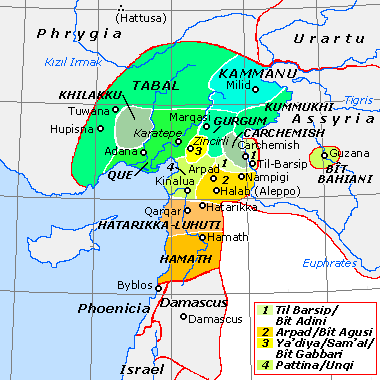
- Ḫiyawa (Que) and its capital Adana among the Neo-Hittite states
- Capital: Adana
- Common languages: Hieroglyphic Luwian, Ancient Greek, Phoenician
- Religion: Luwian religion
- Government: Monarchy
- King
  - r. c. 858 BC – 831 BC: Katî
  - r. c. 831 BC: Kirrî
  - r. c. 738 BC – 709 BC: Awarikus/Warikas
- Historical era: Iron Age
  - Late Bronze Age collapse: c. 12th century BC
  - Disestablished: 8th century BC
Preceded by	Succeeded by
Hittite empire	Ḫilakku
- Today part of: Turkey

Ḫiyawa (Hieroglyphic Luwian: 𔗒𔓱𔗬𔔂) or Adanawa (Hieroglyphic Luwian: 𔐓𔗢𔗬𔔂) was a Luwian-speaking Neo-Hittite state which existed in southeastern Anatolia in the Iron Age.

== Name ==
=== Ḫiyawa ===
The native Luwian name of the kingdom was Ḫiyawa (𔗒𔓱𔗬𔔂), which bears a strong similarity to the name Aḫḫiyawā (𒆳𒌷𒄴𒄭𒅀𒉿𒀀) used to refer to the Achaeans (Ancient Greek: Ἀχαιοί, romanized: Akhaioí, from earlier Ἀχαιϝοί, Akhaiwoí), that is to the Mycenaean Greeks, in the Hittite texts of the Bronze Age. The use of this name for the kingdom of Ḫiyawa might have been the result of a migration of Greek populations from Western Anatolia into this region in the early Iron Age.

The name Ḫiyawa was recorded in Semitic languages in several forms:

- in Neo-Assyrian Akkadian sources as:
  - Qāwe (𒆳𒋡𒀀𒌑𒂊),
  - Qawe (𒆳𒋡𒌑𒂊),
  - Quwe (𒆳𒄣𒌋𒂊 and 𒆳𒄣𒌑𒂊),
  - Que (𒆳𒄣𒂊 and 𒌷𒄣𒂊),
  - Quʾe (𒌷𒄣𒀪),
  - and Qui (𒆳𒄣𒄿);
- the form qwh (𐡒𐡅𐡄) appears in Aramaic sources;
- the form qw (𐤒𐤅) appears in Phoenician sources;
- the form qwh (קוה) appears in Hebrew sources;
- and in Neo-Babylonian Akkadian sources as Ḫuwê (𒆳𒄷𒈨𒂊).

=== Adanawa ===
Another name by which the kingdom of Ḫiyawa was called in its native Hieroglyphic Luwian inscriptions was Adanawa (𔐓𔗢𔗬𔔂), which was derived from the name of the state's capital and was used synonymously with the name Ḫiyawa.

The scholar Rostyslav Oreshko has, however, suggested that the value of the sign 𔗢 was -ḫiya-, and that the name 𔐓𔗢𔗬𔔂 should therefore be read as Aḫḫiyawa. This proposal has, however, been criticised.

=== ʿmq ʾdn ===
The Phoenician inscriptions from Ḫiyawa also used the name lit. 'Plain of Adana' (Phoenician: 𐤏𐤌𐤒 𐤀𐤃𐤍, romanized: ʿmq ʾdn) as the equivalent of both the names Ḫiyawa and Adanawa.

==== The Danunayim ====
In Phoenician language inscriptions, the people of Ḫiyawa are called the Danunayim (𐤃𐤍𐤍𐤉𐤌) likely describing them as the people of Adanawa. This name might be connected with the name of the Land of Danuna (Middle Babylonian Akkadian: 𒆳𒁕𒉡𒈾) mentioned in Late Bronze Age texts, as well as with one of the constituent groups of the Sea Peoples, the Denyen (Late Egyptian: 𓂧𓐰𓄿𓇋𓈖𓐰𓇋𓐱𓍢𓋔𓄿𓌙𓀀𓐱𓀭𓐰𓏥, romanized: dꜣjnjwnꜣ, Ancient Egyptian pronunciation: [da.nu.nə]).

In the Luwian-Phoenician bilingual inscription of one Azzattiwadas who was subordinate to the king Awarikus of Ḫiyawa, the Phoenician language equivalent of the kingdom of Adanawa was given as (land of) the Danunayim (Phoenician: 𐤃𐤍𐤍𐤉𐤌), that is of the Danunians.

In the Luwian-Phoenician bilingual inscription of the king Awarikus of Ḫiyawa, he called his kingdom as Ḫiyawa in Luwian and as (land of the) Danunayim in Phoenician.

Azzattiwadas's inscription referred to the king Awarikus as the lit. 'king of the Danunians' (Phoenician: 𐤌𐤋𐤊 𐤃𐤍𐤍𐤉𐤌, romanized: milk Danunayim) as the equivalent of the Hieroglyphic Luwian term lit. 'king of Adanawa'.

== Geography ==
=== Location ===
The kingdom of Ḫiyawa was located in the eastern section of the Anatolian territory which later in Classical Antiquity became known as Cilicia, more specifically in the plain region which was referred to as Plain Cilicia (Ancient Greek: Κιλικία Πεδιάς, romanized: Kilikía Pediás; Latin: Cilicia Campestris), in the region corresponding to present-day Adana.

Ḫiyawa's boundaries were the Mediterranean Sea in the south, where it formed the Gulf of Alexandretta; the first foothills of the Taurus Mountains in the west, the north-west, and the north; the Amanus Mountains in the east; and the first foothills of the Anti-Taurus Mountains in the north-east. To the south-west, it could have extended along the Erdemli plain until the Limonlu River, or maybe possibly even along the coast until Aspendos, Cebelireis Dağı and possibly even Alanya in the west, although Neo-Assyrian sources do not mention any town of Que to the west of Illubru and Ingirra, implying that the border between Ḫiyawa and Ḫilakku was around the route from İçel/Mersin to Gözne, where there were some difficult to access passes in the mountains as well as a route which followed the coast till Silifke and followed the Calycadnus river till the region of Konya.

The Amanus Mountains formed a natural border which was difficult to cross except in some rare locations which were easy to protect and fortify, and in the centre of the Amanus, the Amanian Gate formed the main way through the mountains. More southwards, the Amanus Mountains reach the Mediterranean Sea in the Cape of Akıncı, and in this region, the main path towards the lower Orontes valley and the kingdom of Pattin was the Belen Pass. The easiest path through the mountains, however, corresponded to the present route from Hasanbeyli to Fevzipaşa, being located on the shortest way from Hasanbeyli to the Samʾalian capital of Zincirli, with the Hasanbeyli inscription having been located at an important point of entry into Ḫiyawa.

In the northern Amanus, access into Ḫiyawa was difficultly achieved through a route towards Maraş towards the Cilician Plain following the road dominating the Ceyhan river and reaching Bahadırlı to the north of Karatepe, which was the ending point of another route which passed through Göksun through Andırın. This double point of access into Ḫiyawa was fortified at Domuztepe and Karatepe, being able to repel movements from the state of Gurgum in the north-east or from the Tabalian region in the north.

In the north, several routes arrived into Ḫiyawa from Kayseri: one went through Göksun and ended at Karatepe; and another more western road went through the passes at Mazgaç and Bağdaş and then at Mehemetli; more westerly were two other routes arriving to Kozan in Ḫiyawa from Kayseri, with the easternmost one passing through Develi, Fraktin, Taşçı, the Gezbel pass, Feke, and the Krazbel/Üsküyenbel pass, having possibly been used since the Hittite Empire, and another passing through Develi, Fraktin and Karaköy.

The main route into Ḫiyawa from the north was through Pozantı and the Cilician Gates, presently the pass of Gülek Boğazi; this route led to Niğde and further west to Ḫupišna, and earlier passed near the silver mines of Bolgar Dağ near the region of Bulgar Maden. In the late 8th century BC, this region formed the northern outlet of the Cilician Gates and was controlled at least in part by the petty-kingdom of Tunna, which was itself probably linked to the kingdom of Tuwana. Within Ḫiyawa, this road ended at Tarsus.

Ḫiyawa's territory originally also covered the mountainous areas to the north-east of the Cilician Plain, although it eventually lost these regions during its conflicts with the Neo-Assyrian Empire and became confined to the plain.

==== Cities ====
The capital of Ḫiyawa was the city of Adana, and other cities of this kingdom included:

- Kisuatni, which preserved the name of Bronze Age Kizzuwatna,
- Tarsus,
- Lusanda, which preserved the name of Bronze Age Lāwazantiya,
- Abarnani,
- Tanakun,
- Lamenaš,
- Timur,
- Paḫar (Hieroglyphic Luwian: 𔕸𔓟𔖱𔔂; Neo-Assyrian Akkadian: 𒌷𒉺𒄴𒊑, romanized: Paḫri; Phoenician: 𐤐𐤏𐤓, romanized: pʿr),
- Ḫarrua,
- Ušnanis,
- Illubru (Hittite Ellipra),
- Ingirâ.

During the 8th century BC, a subordinate of the king Awarikus of Ḫiyawa, named Azzattiwadas, had founded the city of Azzattiwadaya (Hieroglyphic Luwian: 𔐔𔖪𔑣𔗬𔐬𔓱; Phoenician: 𐤀𐤆𐤕𐤅𐤃𐤉, romanized: ʾztwdy), now known as Karatepe, above the valley of the Ceyhan river in the Taurus region of Classical Cilicia, located 100 km to the northeast of Adana.

==== Sub-kingdom ====
The cities of Kundi (Classical Kyinda) and Sissû (Classical Sision) jointly formed a sub-kingdom within the northeastern territory of Ḫiyawa on the boundaries of its plains region.

Multiple "lords of cities" were recorded in Neo-Assyrian sources, implying that Ḫiyawa was constituted of a federation of smaller polities or cities with their own lords who were subjects of the king of Ḫiyawa and later the Neo-Assyrian governor at Adana.

=== Landscape ===
The territory of Ḫiyawa was largely composed of the Cilician Plain, which is a sedimentary table formed by the Ceyhan and Seyhan rivers and which is divided by the Misis Mountains running through it from north to south. To the north are the Taurus Mountains, which can be crossed to reach the kingdom of Tuwana through the Cilician Gates.

=== Neighbours ===
The neighbour of Ḫiyawa to the west was the kingdom of Ḫilakku, and to the north it bordered on the Tabalian kingdoms, while its neighbours were Gurgum in the north-east, Samʾal in the east, and Pattin in the south-east.

== History ==
=== Bronze Age ===
The earliest record of the name of Adanawa is from the period of the Hittite Empire, when it was referred to under the form of Adaniya (Hittite: 𒆳𒌷𒀀𒁕𒉌𒅀) as one of the countries which had revolted against the Hittite king Ammuna.

Adaniya later became part of the kingdom of Kizzuwatna, which was an independent state formed in the 15th century BC out of territories formerly subject to the Hittite Empire, and most of the region which would later become Ḫiyawa was part of Kizzuwatna during the Late Bronze Age.

Kizzuwatna was later reabsorbed into the Hittite Empire when the king Tudḫaliya I annexed it in the 14th century BC.

==== Bronze Age Collapse ====
The people of Adaniya or the Greeks who would later settle in Cilicia during the early Iron Age were likely identical with the Denyen (𓂧𓐰𓄿𓇋𓈖𓐰𓇋𓐱𓍢𓋔𓄿𓌙𓀀𓐱𓀭𓐰𓏥) who participated in the Sea Peoples' attack on Egypt during the reign of the pharaoh Ramesses III.

As part of the movements of the Sea Peoples, who were themselves a collection of various populations displaced by the collapse of their respective societies, their migratory movements passed through the plain of Adana, where some of them consolidated. This migration into Cilicia appears to have been part of a larger process of migrations from the Aegean region into West Asia, and which also gave rise to the Philistines in southern Canaan, Falastin in northern Syria, and the Greek population of Cyprus in the 12th century BC. This movement into Cilicia resulted in the loss of the name Kizzuwatna for this region, and it archaeologically corresponds to the arrival of large quantities of Late Helladic IIIC-type pottery into the Cilician Plain during the 12th and 11th centuries BC.

Thus, as a result of these migratory movements that were part of the Sea Peoples' migrations, Greek populations from Western Anatolia appear to have moved into Cilicia. Due to this, the name of the kingdom, Ḫiyawa (𔗒𔓱𔗬𔔂), bears a strong similarity to the name Aḫḫiyawā (𒆳𒌷𒄴𒄭𒅀𒉿𒀀) used to refer to the Achaeans (Ancient Greek: Ἀχαιοί, romanized: Akhaioí, from earlier Ἀχαιϝοί, Akhaiwoí), that is to the Mycenaean Greeks, in the Hittite texts of the Bronze Age. The name Ḫiyawa also links the kingdom to the "Ḫiyawa-men" (Middle Babylonian Akkadian: 𒇽𒄭𒅀𒌑𒉿𒄿 and 𒇽𒎌𒄭𒅀𒌑𒉿𒄿, romanized: Ḫiyawî; 𒇽𒄭𒅀𒀀𒌑, Ḫiyâw) sent to the Lukka lands mentioned in two Akkadian letters from the Hittite king Šuppiluliuma II to the king Ammurapi of Ugarit.

As a result of this migration, a dynasty of Greek origin appears to have established itself as the ruling line in Ḫiyawa, and later Ḫiyawaean kings claimed descent from the line of one Muksas (Hieroglyphic Luwian: 𔑾𔗧𔗔𔗔), whose name was rendered in Phoenician as mpš (Phoenician: 𐤌𐤐𐤔), which corresponded to the Greek name Mopsos (Ancient Greek: Μόψος), already recorded in Linear B archives from Knossos and Pylos as Mok^{w}sos (Mycenaean Greek: 𐀗𐀦𐀰). This name belonged to a Greek seer who, according to Greek legendary traditions, lived in the period of the Trojan War and along with Amphilochus migrated to Cilicia and founded several Greek settlements on the southern coasts of Anatolia in the Iron Age.

Thus, the ruling dynasty of Ḫiyawa was called the House of Muksas/Mopsos (Hieroglyphic Luwian: 𔑺𔗧𔗔𔗔𔐤 𔔙𔓵𔓯, 𔑾𔗧𔗦𔗦𔐤 𔔙𔓵𔓯, romanized: Muksassan parni; Phoenician: 𐤁𐤕 𐤌𐤐𐤔, romanized: bt mpš).

According to the scholar Stephen Durnford, this migration of Greek elements from the Aegean through the Lukka lands and into Cilicia was recorded in Greek mythology in the form of the story of the movements of Mopsos's grandparent Tiresias (whom he identified with Attarsiya) and of his followers from Thebes to Cilicia. According to Durnford, the founders of the Ḫiyawa kingdom were the same as the "Ḫiyawa-men" mentioned as being in the Lukka lands by the Hittite records: once the kingdom of Tarḫuntašša had collapsed, a group of these "Ḫiyawa-men" would have found it easy to expand from Pamphylia and fill the power vacuum in Plain Cilicia.

There was nonetheless significant continuity as well in Cilicia, with all the main Late Bronze Age sites remaining inhabited through the transition, such as at Soli Höyük, Yumuktepe, Gözlükule, Tepebağ, Sirkeli Höyük, Tatarlı Höyük, and Kinet Höyük; likewise, the names of many locations remained only slightly changed, including:

- Ura ~ Ḫarrua,
- Lamiya,
- Egara ~ Ingira,
- Ellipra ~ Illubru,
- Tarša ~ Tarzu,
- Kummanni/Kizzuwatna ~ Kisuatni,
- Lāwazantiya ~ Lusanda,
- mlwm ~ Mallos,
- Winuwanda ~ Oinandos,
- and Izziya.

=== Iron Age ===
==== Kingdom of Ḫiyawa/Adanawa ====
After the collapse of the Hittite Empire, Adaniya, under the name of Adanawa, became the centre of the Luwian-speaking Neo-Hittite state of Ḫiyawa or Adanawa: among the cities of the Iron Age kingdom of Ḫiyawa, Kisuatni had preserved the name of Bronze Age Kizzuwatna.

Nothing is known about Ḫiyawa during its early existence other than that it appears to have developed independently without any external interference.

At some point in the late 10th and early 9th century BC, Ḫiyawa might have been involved in a conflict with the ruler Suppiluliumas I of Falastin, who in the 10th century BC ruled a wide territory and was embarking on an expansionist venture, followed by hostilities with the kingdoms of Karkamiš and of Gurgum some time later.

In the 9th century BC, Assyria experienced a resurgence in the form of the fledgling Neo-Assyrian Empire, leading to the formation of various military coalitions by the many Neo-Hittite states in reaction to the campaigns of the Neo-Assyrian king Ashurnasirpal II (r. 883 – 859 BC) in Syria during the c. 870s to c. 860s BC: among these was a coalition formed by the kings Katî of Ḫiyawa and Ḥayyā of Samʾal. The campaigns of Ashurnasirpal II's son and successor, Shalmaneser III (r. 859 – 824 BC), would further lead to an intensification of activities in opposition to the Neo-Assyrian Empire in the kingdoms of Syria.

After Shalmaneser III had defeated a coalition of Karkamiš, Samʾal, Pattin and Bit-Adini in Samʾalian territory during his first campaign to the west in 858 BC, the king Suppiluliumas II of Pattin convened the coalition again when Shalmaneser III threatened his own kingdom. In addition to the coalition forces, the Arab tribe of Yasbuq and the country of Yahan from the Aramaean kingdom of Bit Agusi sent reinforcements to these allied forces.

And, although the Neo-Assyrian Empire was a more distant threat to Ḫiyawa and its western neighbour Ḫilakku, which were located to the west of the passes of the Amanus Mountains, Shalmaneser III had erected a gigantic statue of himself at the foot of these mountains as a warning that they were not safe from his forces. Therefore, Ḫiyawa and Ḫilakku feared that Shalmaneser III would attack them next should Pattin fall: during this time, Ḫiyawa was still ruled by Katî, who, along with his neighbour Piḫirim of Ḫilakku, also contributed troops to this alliance, which was however, defeated by the Neo-Assyrian army.

Katî of Ḫiyawa and Piḫirim of Ḫilakku had nonetheless managed to escape from this defeat with their troops unharmed, and Shalmaneser III at most only demanded tribute from them.

Taking advantage from the fact that Shalmaneser III had not invaded southern Anatolia after his victory over the anti-Neo-Assyrian coalition, Katî had tried to expand Ḫiyawa by annexing the kingdom of Samʾal which bordered it to the east, causing Ḥayyā's son, the king Kilamuwa of Samʾal, to change his allegiance and pledge allegiance and offer tribute to Shalmaneser III in exchange of Neo-Assyrian protection against Katî's ambitions.

===== Ḫiyawaean campaign of Shalmaneser III =====
Thus, it was in 839 BC that Shalmaneser III would first campaign in Ḫiyawa, when he crossed Mount Timur, that is the Amanus Range, between Zincirli and Hasanbeyli, and captured Lusanda, Abarnanu, and Kisuatni, which were three eastern fortified Ḫiyawaean cities, before allegedly capturing more cities and erecting statues of himself at the western and eastern ends of Ḫiyawa. Shalmaneser III then attacked the kingdom's capital itself, but Katî was able to remain secure of his throne.

Since the Ḫiyawaean region was less wealthy than the regions of Syria and Palestine from which Shalmaneser III had already obtained rich tribute, and these distant lands which were too far for him to impose any authority upon, the goal of Shalmaneser III's campaign in these regions which Neo-Assyrian armies had never previously invaded was likely to bolster his image as a warrior within his own empire.

In 837 BC, Shalmaneser III campaigned against the Tabalian kingdoms to the north of Ḫiyawa, after which he might have crossed the Cilician Gates into Ḫiyawa itself during his journey back to Assyria, when he besieged Katî in the royal city of Paḫri (Paḫar), after which Katî submitted to him and offered him his daughter with dowry as pledge of his future loyalty, following which Shalmaneser III reinstated Katî on the throne of Ḫiyawa. Once Shalmaneser III had concluded his campaign and returned to Assyria, however, Katî rejected all claims of being a Neo-Assyrian vassal.

Three more campaigns in Ḫiyawa by Shalmaneser III followed in 833 BC, 832 BC and 831 BC, during which he besieged and captured the cities of Timur (whose inhabitants he massacred), Tanakun (whose ruler Tulli submitted to Shalmaneser and paid him a tribute of silver, gold, iron, oxen and sheep), and Lamenaš, before marching to Tarza (Tarsus), which submitted to Shalmaneser III without resisting and paid him a tribute of gold and silver. In Tarza, Shalmaneser III deposed Katî, whose fate is unknown, and replaced him with his brother Kirrî, who might have been a governor of Tarsus whom Shalmaneser III rewarded with kingship over Ḫiyawa thanks to his submission without resistance.

Shalmaneser III's focus on repeatedly campaigning in Ḫiyawa was motivated by a need to successfully submit Ḫiyawa in the aftermath of the meagre successes of his campaigns in Syria and Palestine: he feared that failure to do so would have made him seen as weak, and therefore would encourage further rebellions against the Neo-Assyrian Empire in the region.

After this, Neo-Assyrian military campaigns to Anatolia ended, possibly because this region had submitted to Neo-Assyrian overlordship at least temporarily.

===== Late 9th century and early 8th century BC =====
Ḫiyawa, along with Pattin, Gurgum, Samʾal and Malizi, might have been among the eight states which had formed a coalition, headed by Attar-sumki I of Arpad, against which the Neo-Assyrian king Adad-nirari III (r. 811 – 783 BC) had to fight when he campaigned in Syria in 805 BC. This alliance fielded a large army that Adad-nirari III was nevertheless able to defeat, although this Neo-Assyrian victory did not mean the end of the coalition, which continued to resist Adad-nirari III's efforts to destroy it.

Around c. 800 BC, Ḫiyawa joined the nearby states of Gurgum, Pattin, and Malizi in rebelling against the Neo-Assyrian Empire, and around c. 796 BC, an unnamed king of Ḫiyawa joined an alliance by the kingdoms of Damascus and Bit Agusi, and which also included Falastin, Gurgum, Samʾal, Melid, and two other states whose names have been lost, which besieged the king Zakkur of Ḥamat in the city of Ḥaḏrak.

Although the states of southern and central Anatolia had remained safe from further Neo-Assyrian aggression after the completion of Shalmaneser III's campaigns, these conflicts opposing Ḫiyawa to the Neo-Assyrian Empire caused a curtailment of its territory, so that it had become limited to the Cilician plain by the reign of the Neo-Assyrian king Tiglath-pileser III.

===== Submission to the Neo-Assyrian Empire =====
By the later decades of the 8th century BC, Ḫiyawa had come under Neo-Assyrian overlordship again, after the Neo-Assyrian king Tiglath-pileser III (r. 745 – 727 BC) had defeated and annexed Bit Agusi.

During this time, Ḫiyawa was ruled by the king Awarikus or Warikas, who by c. 728 BC was a tributary of Tiglath-pileser III and remained a loyal client-ruler of the Neo-Assyrian Empire during the reigns of Tiglath-pileser III, Shalmaneser V (r. 727 – 722 BC) and Sargon II (r. 722 – 705 BC).

Whether Awarikus continued his tribute payments and their regularity and dates is not recorded, and there is no presence of the Neo-Assyrian army recorded in Ḫiyawa at this date. However, the fact that Tiglath-pileser III was able to send his chief eunuch to depose the king Wasusarmas of Tabal in 729 BC means that the Neo-Assyrian military had access through the territory of Ḫiyawa.

The inscriptions of Awarikus himself suggest that he was an ally or partner of the Neo-Assyrian Empire whereby the Neo-Assyrian king was a protector or suzerain of Ḫiyawa who had a treaty with his client Awarikus: in his bilingual inscription, Awarikus declared that the king and the Neo-Assyrian imperial dynasty had become a "mother and father to him," and that the people of Ḫiyawa and Assyria had become "one house," attesting of the special relationship between Awarikus and Sargon II, who was the overlord of Awarikus in the later years of his reign.

Thanks to this partnership and to his loyalty to the Neo-Assyrian Empire, Awarikus would maintain his throne until the late 8th century BC and rule over Ḫiyawa for a long period. And, as reward for helping Tiglath-pileser III against the anti-Neo-Assyrian rebellion organised by Matiʿ-ʾEl of Bit Agusi with the support of Urartu in 743 BC, Awarikus was granted a frontier region which significantly increased the size of Ḫiyawa.

Awarikus himself had a subordinate named Azzattiwadas,, whom he had personally elevated to the position of a regional ruler in eastern Ḫiyawa some time before 713 BC, although Azzattiwadas's exact rank is still unknown.

In his inscription, Awarikus claimed to have built fifteen fortresses in the west and east of Ḫiyawa.

===== Between Phrygia and Assyria =====
Following the union of the Phrygians and the Muški under the Phrygian king Midas, this latter king was able to extend his kingdom to the east across the Halys river into the former core territory of the Hittite Empire and build a large empire in Anatolia which reached the Aegean Sea in the west and the environs of the Euphrates and borders of the Tabalian region in the east and south. The eastward expansionist ventures of Midas in the east soon led to his fledgling Phrygian empire becoming a major rival to Neo-Assyrian power in eastern Anatolia, especially when Midas initiated contacts with Neo-Assyrian vassals, causing the Tabalian region, which bordered on Ḫiyawa to the north, to become contested between the Neo-Assyrian and Phrygian empires.

Since the Tabalian region was a subject of the Neo-Assyrian Empire, this Phrygian expansion increased the possibility of war between the two rival empires. Thus, the Tabalian region found itself wedged between the Neo-Assyrian and Phrygian empires, both of whom saw it as a strategically useful buffer zone to contain the other's expansionist ambitions.

Therefore, Midas tried to persuade the still independent local rulers of the Tabalian region to switch their allegiances to Phrygia: the loyalty of the Tabalian kings to the Neo-Assyrian Empire was unsteady, and those among them who were diplomatically approached by Midas might have preferred renouncing their allegiance to the Neo-Assyrian Empire and instead allying with Midas. Thus, the kings of the Tabalian region found themselves having to choose whether aligning themselves with the Neo-Assyrian or the Phrygian empire was in their interests, and several of them did accept Midas's offer.

In addition to the wavering loyalty of the Tabalian kings, the possibility of an alliance between Midas and Rusa I of Urartu further threatened Neo-Assyrian power not only in southeastern Anatolia, but also throughout all of eastern Anatolia and in northern Mesopotamia.

To counter the threat of the rising power of Phrygia, Sargon II tried to establish a centralised authority under a ruler whom he could trust in the Tabalian region, and he therefore reorganised the kingdom of Tabal proper into the state of Bīt-Burutaš, significantly enlarged with the addition of Ḫilakku into it, under the rule of the son of the former Tabalian king Ḫullî, the king Ambaris, to whom he had married his daughter Aḫat-abiša.

However, Midas continued pressuring the western Neo-Assyrian territories and intensified his efforts to persuade the local rulers of this region to renounce their vassalage to the Neo-Assyrian Empire, and he even launched attacks as far south as the territories of Ḫiyawa. In addition to finding themselves pressured by Phrygia or Urartu, several of the western vassals of the Neo-Assyrian Empire might also have themselves initiated contacts with Phrygia and Urartu with the hope of freeing themselves from Neo-Assyrian suzerainty, thus leading to a series of anti-Assyrian uprisings by the Anatolian vassals of the Neo-Assyrian Empire during the rest of Sargon II's reign.

At the same time, Midas was trying to win over this area directly through military action as well, with Phrygian operation reaching as far south as Ḫiyawa, where Sargon II defeated Midas twice in 715 BC, thanks to which he was able to restore the fortresses of Ḫarrua, Qumasi and Ušnanis, which Midas had previously captured from Ḫiyawa. That same year, Sargon II defeated Ionian Greek pirates on the coasts of Ḫiyawa.

Ambaris himself came under pressure from Midas, who attempted to persuade him to renounce Neo-Assyrian allegiance and join him, initially through diplomatic means and later through military threats. This situation left Ambaris with little choice but to accept an alliance with Phrygia and renounce his allegiance to the Neo-Assyrian Empire. Facing increased pressure from both Midas of Phrygia and Argišti II of Urartu, Ambaris communicated with them seeking guarantees that they would protect him should he break his ties with the Neo-Assyrian Empire.

Neo-Assyrian intelligence however intercepted Ambaris's messages to Phrygia and Urartu, causing him to lose favour with Sargon II, who accused him of conspiring with these rival powers and consequently deported Ambaris, his family and his chief courtiers to Assyria in 713 BC, after which a Neo-Assyrian governor was imposed on Bīt-Burutaš, Ḫilakku and Ḫiyawa by Sargon II, with the first of these being Aššur-šarru-uṣur, who possibly as early as 713 BC was appointed as governor of Ḫiyawa and also held authority on Ḫilakku and the Tabalian region.

===== Imposition of Neo-Assyrian governorship =====
With the Tabalian region being volatile due to the encroachment of Phrygia, and the kings Warpalawas II of Tuwana and Awarikus of Ḫiyawa being too elderly to efficiently maintain Neo-Assyrian authority in southeastern Anatolia despite having been loyal Neo-Assyrian vassals, Sargon II had therefore assimilated Bīt-Burutaš and Ḫilakku into the Neo-Assyrian provincial system and appointed over them a governor who also held authority over the kingdoms of Ḫiyawa and Tuwana to make sure that the whole region would be united under the rule of the Neo-Assyrian Empire.

Following this, Awarikus came under the authority of Aššur-šarru-uṣur, who was himself the representative of Sargon II in Ḫiyawa, while Awarikus himself became either a token king or was even deposed and assigned to a position of lower rank, such as an advisor to Aššur-šarru-uṣur. Under this arrangement, all power over the state of Ḫiyawa was given to Aššur-šarru-uṣur, while the Neo-Assyrian administration preserved the illusion, for diplomatic purposes, that Awarikus was still the ruler of Ḫiyawa in partnership with Aššur-šarru-uṣur.

Thus, Ḫiyawa and other nearby Anatolian kingdoms were placed under the authority of Aššur-šarru-uṣur. Following the appointment of Aššur-šarru-uṣur, Awarikus of Ḫiyawa and Warpalawas II of Tuwana became largely symbolic rulers although they might have still held the power to manage their kingdoms locally.

This arrangement might have led to tensions between Awarikus and Aššur-šarru-uṣur, and likely caused Awarikus to become disillusioned with Neo-Assyrian rule following his long period of loyal service to the Neo-Assyrian monarchy.

Therefore, Awarikus might have tried to rebel against Neo-Assyrian overlordship, and he soon attempted to send a secret delegation to negotiate with the king of Urartu.

However, Sargon II was seeking to conclude an arrangement with Midas to avert the danger of a Phrygian alliance with Urartu, and after Aššur-šarru-uṣur managed to lead three successful expeditions in the kingdom of Midas in 710 BC, the hostilities between the Neo-Assyrian and Phrygian empires soon came to an end by c. 709 BC, thus averting the danger of war between the two powers. Another reason for Midas's appeasement of the Neo-Assyrian Empire might also have been an attempt by him to safeguard his kingdom against the Cimmerians, a nomadic Iranic people who had migrated into West Asia from the Eurasian Steppe, and who were starting to attack Phrygia.

The normalisation of relations between the Neo-Assyrian and Phrygian empires, meanwhile, gave Sargon II a solution to the failures of his strategies in Anatolia by providing him with the opportunity to consolidate Neo-Assyrian rule over this region. This is attested in a letter by Sargon II to Aššur-šarru-uṣur in which he described the Tabalian kings as having been made helpless thanks to the peace concluded between Phrygia and the Neo-Assyrian Empire, so that Aššur-šarru-uṣur would "press them from this side" and Midas would "press them from that side."

As part of this normalisation of relations, Midas intercepted Awarikus's fourteen-man delegation to Urartu and handed it over to Aššur-šarru-uṣur, who reported of it to Sargon II.

===== Annexation by the Neo-Assyrian Empire =====
As a punishment for his act of rebellion, Awarikus was deposed and possibly executed in 709 BC, his dynasty was removed from power and Ḫiyawa's monarchy was abolished, while the state itself was annexed into the Neo-Assyrian Empire and made into the province of Que, thus losing its status as a client-kingdom. Meanwhile, the powers which Aššur-šarru-uṣur already held were formalised when he was given full control of Que.

In 705 BC, Sargon II campaigned against the Cimmerians in Tabal, but he died in battle against one Tabalian ruler named Gurdî of Kulummu, with central and southeastern Anatolia consequently becoming independent again, thus destabilising the region and leaving it vulnerable to the attacks of the Cimmerians. After this, the direct presence of Neo-Assyrian officials and military in Central Anatolia, including in Ḫilakku and the Tabalian region, ceased being attested.

===== Regained independence =====
Following the death of Sargon II in battle, Neo-Assyrian control of Ḫiyawa was also lost, and the region itself descended into a state of disorder while it might have been invaded by either the Phrygians or the Cimmerians. Awarikus's subordinate Azzattiwadas at this time became regent and reacted by organising a significant military force to restore authority and expel the invaders, expanding Ḫiyawa's borders in the east and the west, and increasing the defences of the realm's borderlands by building a series of fortifications similarly to how overlord Awarikus had once done.

Azzattiwadas also claimed to have restored the prosperity of Ḫiyawa by organising the planting of crops and vineyards and replenishing the grazing areas with cattle and sheep. Azzattiwadas undertook these measures as a representative of his overlord Awarikus's dynasty, the House of Muksas/Mopsos, which he restored to Ḫiyawa's throne after it had been initially removed from power by making Awarikus's son the king of Ḫiyawa.

One of the fortresses built by Azzattiwadas, located on a hilltop in the northeastern border regions of Ḫiyawa to protect the kingdom, was named Azzattiwadaya after himself, and corresponds to the site now known as Karatepe. Azzattiwadaya was likely the centre of power of Azzattiwadas in the eastern part of Ḫiyawa, which had been placed under his authority. Around this time, Azzattiwadas inscribed a a bilingual Luwian and Phoenician inscription at Azzattiwadaya itself commemorating his foundation of this city: this inscription was unusual in its use of the Phoenician language, since the other Neo-Hittite states instead used Aramaic in addition to Hieroglyphic Luwian for their inscriptions.

Further west, Azzattiwadas might have also built the city of Aspendos, whose name in Pamphylian Greek, Estwedus (Εστϝεδυς), might refer to Azzattiwadas's name.

Several rebellions against the Neo-Assyrian Empire broke out in Anatolia after Sargon II's death, with one Kirūa who was city-lord of Illubru, instigating a rebellion in Ḫilakku, as well as in the Ḫiyawaean cities of Ingirâ and Tarsus who blocked the passes in the Amanus range which led to Ḫiyawa.

===== Reconquest by the Neo-Assyrian Empire =====
In 696 BC, Sargon II's son and successor, Sennacherib (r. 705 – 681 BC), sent an army to suppress this rebellion: the Neo-Assyrian forces captured Ingirâ and Tarsus, before besieging Illubru and flaying the rebels after seizing it, following which they deported Illubru's inhabitants. Sennacherib rebuilt Illubru and Tarsus to maintain Neo-Assyrian control of the Cilician Gates and resettled it, and erected a stela dedicated to the Assyrian national god Aššur at Illubru - which was still visible to Alexander III of Macedonia during his conquest of the Achaemenid Empire in 333 BC - and a statue of himself at Tarsus.

This possibly allowed Sennacherib to reimpose a level of control on Que, since the Neo-Assyrian governor Aššur-daʾʾinanni of Que is recorded as the eponym for 685 BC, although the degree to which he was able to control it is uncertain. According to records of the later Hellenistic Babylonian writer Berossus summarised by the Roman historian Eusebius of Caesarea, Ionian Greek pirates also participated in this rebellion, although Sennacherib appears to have failed at subduing them due to their greater mobility.

In 679 BC, Sennacherib's son and successor, Esarhaddon (r. 681 – 669 BC), campaigned in the Tabalian region against the Cimmerians from his base in Que and Ḫilakku, resulting in the defeat and killing of the Cimmerian king Teušpâ in Ḫubišna and the annexation of the sub-kingdom of Kundi and Sissû in Que, whose king Sanduarri fled into the mountains, and of a part of the territory of Ḫilakku. Esarhaddon appears to have reached Ḫubišna by passing through the Calycadnus river valley and bypassing the Anti-Taurus Mountains and Tabal proper.

It was therefore likely only under the rule of Esarhaddon that Neo-Assyrian authority in Que was fully restored and the region was again made into a Neo-Assyrian province.

Despite this victory, and although Esarhaddon had managed to stop the advance of Cimmerians in Que so it remained under Neo-Assyrian control, the military operations were not successful enough for the Assyrians to firmly occupy the areas around of Ḫubišna, nor were they able to secure the borders of the Neo-Assyrian Empire, leaving Que vulnerable to incursions from Tabal, Kuzzurak and Ḫilakku, who were allied to the western Cimmerians who were establishing themselves in Anatolia at this time. Thus, Esarhaddon was left remaining wary of possible attacks on Que by Ḫilakku or Tabal.

In 677 BC, Esarhaddon's forces captured the king Sanduarri of Kundi and Sissû and executed him by beheading, five months after the rebellious king of Sidon, Abdi-Milkutti, was himself beheaded: the magnates of both Sanduarri and Abdi-Milkutti were both paraded through the streets of the Neo-Assyrian capital of Nineveh with the heads of Sanduarri and Abdi-Milkutti hanged around their necks.

After this, Que seems to have remained under the rule of the Neo-Assyrian Empire until the end of the reign of Esarhaddon's son and successor, Ashurbanipal (r. 669 – 631 BC), and several Neo-Assyrian governors of Que during his reign were eponyms, including Amyanu in 655 BC, as well as Nabû-daʾʾinanni and Marduk-šarru-uṣur under the reign of Ashurbanipal, and one under that of Aššur-etil-ilāni (r. 631 – 627 BC).

Nevertheless, Ḫiyawa appears to have persisted until the end of the Neo-Assyrian Empire, as attested by an inscription from Cebelireis Dagi from the period between c. 650 and c. 600 BC mentions a king bearing the typically Ḫiyawaean name of wryk (𐤅𐤓𐤉𐤊).

===== Annexation by the Neo-Babylonian Empire =====
In the early 6th century BC, the Neo-Babylonian Empire, which had succeeded the Neo-Assyrian Empire, campaigned several times into Ḫuwê, that is, into Ḫiyawa. Although there is lacking evidence of Neo-Babylonian control over Ḫuwê, the Neo-Babylonian king Nebuchadnezzar II (r. 605 – 562 BC) claimed to have conquered Ḫuwê and Pirindu (that is Ḫilakku); the presence of prisoners from Ḫuwê and Pirindu in Babylon also suggests that Nebuchadnezzar II did indeed campaign in Ḫuwê.

In 557 BC, the king Appuwašu of Pirindu attempted to attack the Syrian provinces of the Neo-Babylonian Empire, possibly as a result of tensions regarding the control of Ḫuwê.

Nebuchadnezzar II's son-in-law, the Neo-Babylonian king Neriglissar (r. 560 – 556 BC), responded by marching to Ḫuwê, where Appuwašu launched a failed ambush attempt on him before being defeated, after which Neriglissar pursued Appuwašu into Pirindu itself, where he captured Ura and Kiršu as well as the island fortress of Pitusu, before marching till Sallunê, which was the most western city on the coast of Cilicia, and to the borders of the Lydian Empire before returning to Babylon.

The last Neo-Babylonian king, Nabonidus (r. 556 – 539 BC), later claimed to have conducted a campaign in Ḫuwê in 555 BC, shortly after he became king, during which he took several prisoners.

===== Classical Cilicia =====
After 555 BC, Ḫiyawa is no longer mentioned, and it appears to have been annexed by Ḫilakku, which thus reached the Euphrates river in the east.

The Ancient Greeks borrowed the name of Ḫilakku, under the form of Kilikia (Ancient Greek: Κιλικία; Latin: Cilicia), to designate this state, thus extending the name of Ḫilakku to the whole of the territories of both Ḫiyawa and Ḫilakku.

Meanwhile, the Neo-Assyrian period distinction between Ḫiyawa and Ḫilakku was preserved in the Greek designation for the two sections of Cilicia: Kilikia Pedias (Ancient Greek: Κιλικία Πεδιάς, lit. 'Plain Cilicia'; Latin: Cilicia Campestris) corresponded to Ḫiyawa, while Kilikia Trakheia (Ancient Greek: Κιλικία Τραχεῖα, lit. 'Rough Cilicia'; Latin: Cilicia Aspera) corresponded to Ḫilakku.

===== Legacy =====
====== Ancient ======
Ḫiyawa appears in the Hebrew Bible under the name of Qōweh (Biblical Hebrew: קוה; English: Keveh or Kue) as a trading partner of the Israelite king Solomon.

It has also been speculated that descendants of Anatolian populations from Ḫiyawa might appear in the Hebrew Bible as the Canaanite tribe of the Hivites (Biblical Hebrew: חִוִּ֥י, romanized: Ḥiwwî), whose Hebrew name might perhaps have been derived from that of Ḫiyawa.

====== Modern ======
Azzattiwadas's bilingual inscription, consisting of two Hieroglyphic Luwian texts and three Phoenician texts paralleling the Luwian ones, played an important role in the deciphering of the Anatolian hieroglyphic script.

== Society and culture ==
=== Population ===
During the Bronze Age, the population of what would later become the kingdom of Ḫiyawa was composed of both Hurrians and Luwians. Like Ḫilakku and the kingdoms of the nearby Tabalian region, the population of Iron Age Ḫiyawa was descended from the largely Late Bronze Age Luwian inhabitants of the region.

Luwian personal names would remain attested in Ḫiyawa until the Roman period.

Other populations also appear to have inhabited Ḫiyawa during the Iron Age, as attested by the use of the Phoenician language there.

==== Greek presence ====
The name of the kingdom, Ḫiyawa (𔗒𔓱𔗬𔔂), bears a strong similarity to the name Aḫḫiyawā (𒆳𒌷𒄴𒄭𒅀𒉿𒀀) used to refer to the Achaeans (Ancient Greek: Ἀχαιοί, romanized: Akhaioí, from earlier Ἀχαιϝοί, Akhaiwoí), that is to the Mycenaean Greeks, in the Hittite texts of the Bronze Age. The name Ḫiyawa might have been a derivation of Aḫḫiyawā, and therefore the use of this name for the kingdom of Ḫiyawa might have been the result of the participation of Achaeans in its formation following a migration of Greek populations from Western Anatolia into this region in the early Iron Age.

The name Danunayim of Ḫiyawa also corresponds to the Middle Babylonian Danuna (Middle Babylonian Akkadian: 𒆳𒁕𒉡𒈾) and the Egyptian dꜣjnjwnꜣ (𓂧𓐰𓄿𓇋𓈖𓐰𓇋𓐱𓍢𓋔𓄿𓌙𓀀𓐱𓀭𓐰𓏥), which themselves appear to have been designations of Mycenaean Greeks recorded in the Homeric texts under the form of Danaoi (Δαναοί).

In the Çineköy inscription, the king Awarikus claimed descent from the line of one Muksas (Hieroglyphic Luwian: 𔑾𔗧𔗔𔗔), whose name was rendered in Phoenician as mpš (Phoenician: 𐤌𐤐𐤔), which corresponded to the Greek name Mopsos (Ancient Greek: Μόψος; Mycenaean Greek: 𐀗𐀦𐀰, romanized: Mok^{w}sos), belonging to a seer whom Greek legendary traditions described as having migrated to Cilicia and founded several Greek settlements on the southern coasts of Anatolia in the Iron Age. During the Hellenistic period, two cities of Ḫiyawa, Mopsouestia (lit. 'Mopsos's hearth') and Mopsoukrēnē (lit. 'Mopsos's spring'), were so called after Mopsos, and the Roman author Pliny the Elder noted that Cilicia was named Mopsopia after Mopsos, while the city of Mallos was claimed to have been founded by Mopsos. Thus, Mopsos and his dynasty appear to have pursued a policy of city-founding.

The legend of Mopsos recorded historical population movements from the Aegean Sea into Cilicia, which in turn suggests that the ruling dynasty of Ḫiyawa might have been founded by Greek colonists, thus being connected to the kingdom's name, and implying that a Greek population lived within Ḫiyawa. Later, in the 5th century BC, the Greek author Herodotus of Halicarnassus claimed that the population of Cilicia was formerly called Hupakhaioi (Ὑπαχαιοὶ), that is lit. 'Mix-Achaeans', implying that they were descended from Achaeans.

The persistence of the name Ḫiyawa into the later Iron Age might therefore have reflected the continued existence of a significant Greek population in this region in these times. This population would have eventually started speaking both Greek and Luwic with significant Creolisation, similarly as in nearby Pamphylia, although its members might have become semi-speakers or even non-speakers of Greek by the 8th century BC.

The Karatepe inscription might record a Greek epithet of the god Baʿal, krntryš (𐤊𐤓𐤍𐤕𐤓𐤉𐤔), that is the Luwian god Tarḫunzas, which possibly derived from the Greek term *Korunētērios (*Κορυνητήριος), meaning lit. 'mace-bearing', and being a parallel of the Phoenician theonym bʿl ṣmd, that is lit. 'Baʿal of the Mace'. The Çebel Ires Daǧı inscription also preserved some Greek names, showing that there was a Greek linguistic stratum in Ḫiyawa during the Iron Age.

The name of the king of Ḫiyawa, Awarikus/Warikas, might also have been of Greek origin.

In addition to this Greek presence from an early period, Greek colonists also settled on the coast of Cilicia, where they established colonies such as Nagidos and Kelenderis founded by Samos, Soli founded by Lindos, and Greeks also settled in native Ḫiyawaean settlements like at Anchiale and Tarsus.

Due to the probable Greek presence in Ḫiyawa and the fact that Ḫiyawa itself was located on the former territory of Kizzuwatna, there is a possibility that it was through this region that certain Luwian and Hurrian elements, such as the myth of Kumarbi which formed the basis for Hesiod's Theogony, the borrowing of the name Pēgasos (Πήγασος) from Luwian piḫassassis, and the transmission of the name Suria (Συρία) from a late Luwian name for Assyria into the Greek language.

=== Monumental tradition ===
The Neo-Hittite rulers of Ḫiyawa continued to follow the typically Anatolian tradition of building public monuments with Hieroglyphic Luwian inscriptions until the late 8th century BC, even as they were increasingly adopting the use of the Phoenician language and script as a language of international communication.

=== Trade ===
Thanks to its advantageous location on the Mediterranean Sea, Ḫiyawa had good maritime links with the bassin of the lower Orontes valley, in what is now Hatay, which was then occupied by the kingdom of Pattin, as well as with the Phoenician coast where were located the cities of Arwad, Byblos, Sidon and Tyre, and with the island of Cyprus. This opening towards the sea offered Ḫiyawa with several economic and commercial advantages.

== Archaeology ==
Sites in Ḫiyawa which have been excavated include:

- Kinet Höyük,
- Tatarli Höyük,
- Sirkeli Höyük,
- Misis,
- Adana-Tepebağ,
- Tarsus-Gözlükule,
- Mersin-Yumuktepe,
- and Mersin-Soli Höyük.

Archaeological research in the territory of Iron Age Ḫiyawa has been limited to a small number of sites, such as Tarsus, Mersin, Sirkeli Höyük and Karatepe, though they reveal a high population density in Hiyawa during this period.

The visual arts of Ḫiyawa show that its material culture was fully part of the Neo-Hittite cultural area, although links to Phrygia as well as to the Luwian-Aramaean and Phoenician polities of northern Syria and the Levant also existed.

Pottery finds suggest that strong links existed between Cilicia and the Phoenician communities of Cyprus from the late 10th to the early 7th century BC: Iron Age Cilician pottery shows numerous imports from Cyprus, but also a high number of local imitations of Cypriot ceramics, implying a sort of koinē united Plain Cilicia and Cyprus.

== List of rulers ==
=== Rulers of Ḫiyawa ===
- ᵐKatî (Neo-Assyrian Akkadian: 𒁹𒅗𒋾𒄿; Hieroglyphic Luwian: *Katiyas), r. c. 858 BC – 831 BC
- ᵐKirrî (Neo-Assyrian Akkadian: 𒁹𒆠𒅕𒊑𒄿), r. c. 831 BC
- Unnamed king, r. c. 796 BC
- Awarikus (Hieroglyphic Luwian: 𔐓𔗬𔖱𔗜𔗔; Phoenician: 𐤀𐤅𐤓𐤊, romanized: ʾwrk) or Warikas (Hieroglyphic Luwian: 𔗬𔖱𔓯𔗧𔗦; Phoenician: 𐤅𐤓𐤉𐤊, romanized: wryk; Neo-Assyrian Akkadian: 𒁹𒌑𒊑𒅅𒆠, romanized: ᵐUrikki), r. c. 738 BC – 709 BC

=== Rulers of Kundi and Sissû ===
- ᵐSanduarri (Neo-Assyrian Akkadian: 𒁹𒊓𒀭𒁺𒅈𒊑 and 𒁹𒊓𒀭𒁺𒌋𒅈𒊑; Luwian: *Sanda-warris)

== Sources ==
- Adalı, Selim Ferruh (2017). "Cimmerians and the Scythians: the Impact of Nomadic Powers on the Assyrian Empire and the Ancient Near East". In Kim, Hyun Jin; Vervaet, Frederik Juliaan; Adalı, Selim Ferruh (eds.). Eurasian Empires in Antiquity and the Early Middle Ages Contact and Exchange between the Graeco- Roman World, Inner Asia and China. Cambridge, United Kingdom: Cambridge University Press. pp. 60–82. ISBN 978-1-107-19041-2.
- Aro, Sanna (2013). "Tabal". In Streck, Michael P. [in German]; Frantz-Szabó, Gabriella; Krebernik, Manfred [in German]; Bonacossi, D. Morandi; Postgate, J. N.; Seidl, Ursula [in German]; Stol, M.; Wilhelm, Gernot [in German] (eds.). Reallexikon der Assyriologie und Vorderasiatischen Archäologie [Encyclopaedia of Ancient Near Eastern Studies] (in German). Vol. 13. Berlin, Germany: Walter de Gruyter. ISBN 978-3-110-30715-3.
- Aro, S. (2014). "Uassurme". In Streck, Michael P. [in German]; Frantz-Szabó, Gabriella; Krebernik, Manfred [in German]; Bonacossi, D. Morandi; Postgate, J. N.; Seidl, Ursula [in German]; Stol, M.; Wilhelm, Gernot [in German] (eds.). Reallexikon der Assyriologie und Vorderasiatischen Archäologie [Encyclopaedia of Ancient Near Eastern Studies] (in German). Vol. 14. Berlin, Germany: Walter de Gruyter. p. 257. ISBN 978-3-110-41761-6.
- Aro, Sanna (2023). "Vanishing kingdoms: Tabal and Tuwana during the seventh century BC". In Draycott, Catherine M.; Branting, Scott; Lehner, Joseph W.; Özarslan, Yasemin (eds.). From Midas to Cyrus and Other Stories: Papers on Iron Age Anatolia in Honour of Geoffrey and Françoise Summers. BIAA Monograph Series. London, United Kingdom: British Institute at Ankara. pp. 113–135. ISBN 978-1-912-09011-2.
- Baker, Heather D. (2023). "The Assyrian Empire: A View from Within". In Radner, Karen; Moeller, Nadine; Potts, Daniel T. (eds.). The Age of Assyria. The Oxford History of the Ancient Near East. Vol. 4. New York City, United States: Oxford University Press. pp. 257–351. ISBN 978-0-190-68763-2.
- Bryce, Trevor (2009). The Routledge Handbook of the Peoples and Places of Ancient Western Asia: From the Early Bronze Age to the Fall of the Persian Empire. London, United Kingdom: Routledge. ISBN 978-0-415-39485-7.
- Bryce, Trevor (2012). The World of The Neo-Hittite Kingdoms: A Political and Military History. Oxford, United Kingdom: Oxford University Press. ISBN 978-0-199-21872-1.
- Bryce, Trevor (2016). "The land of Hiyawa (Que) revisited". Anatolian Studies. 66: 67–79. doi:10.1017/S0066154616000053.
- DeGrado, Jessie (2022). "Azatiwada's Empire: Adapting Assyrian Imagery in the Bilingual Karatepe Inscription". News from the Lands of the Hittites. 5–6. Mimesis Edizioni: 21–45.
- Çambel, Halet; Röllig, Wolfgang [in German]; Hawkins, John D. [in German] (1999). Karatepe-Arslantaş: The Inscriptions: Facsimile Edition. Corpus of Hieroglyphic Luwian Inscriptions. Vol. 2. Berlin, Germany; New York City, United States: Walter de Gruyter. ISBN 978-3-110-87975-9.
- D'Alfonso, Lorenzo (2012). "Tabal, an 'out-group' definition in the first Millennium BCE". In Lanfranchi, Giovanni B.; Bonacossi, Daniele Morandi; Pappi, Cinzia; Ponchia, Simonetta [in German] (eds.). Leggo! Studies Presented to Frederick Mario Fales on the Occasion of His 65ᵗʰ Birthday. Wiesbaden, Germany: Harrassowitz Verlag. pp. 173–194. ISBN 978-3-447-06659-4.
- Durnford, Stephen P. B. (2021). "On some Late Helladic migrants into Anatolia named in Hittite and Luwian sources, their migration to Iron Age Cilicia and their return to Greece in legend". ARAMAZD: Armenian Journal of Near Eastern Studies. 15 (1–2): 43–127. doi:10.32028/ajnes.v15i1-2.1300.
- Ebeling, Erich [in German] (1932). "Ambaris". In Ebeling, Erich [in German]; Meissner, Bruno (eds.). Reallexikon der Assyriologie und Vorderasiatischen Archäologie [Encyclopaedia of Ancient Near Eastern Studies] (in German). Vol. 1. Berlin, Germany: Walter de Gruyter. pp. 93–94. ISBN 978-3-112-35785-9.
- Edzard, D. O. (1980). "Kirua". In Edzard, Dietz Otto; Calmeyer, Peter [in German]; Moortgat, A.; Otten, Heinrich [in German]; Röllig, Wolfgang [in German]; von Soden, W.; Wiseman, D. J. (eds.). Reallexikon der Assyriologie und Vorderasiatischen Archäologie [Encyclopaedia of Ancient Near Eastern Studies] (in German). Vol. 5. Berlin, Germany: Walter de Gruyter. p. 607. ISBN 978-3-110-07192-4.
- Gander, Max (2012). "Aḫḫiyawa – Ḫiyawa – Que: Gibt es Evidenz für die Anwesenheit von Griechen in Kilikien am Übergang von der Bronze- zur Eisenzeit" [Aḫḫiyawa – Ḫiyawa – Que: Is there Evidence of the Presence of Greeks in Cilicia during the Transition from the Bronze Age to the Iron Age?]. Studi Micenei ed Egeo-Anatolici [Mycenaean and Aegean-Anatolian Studies]. 54: 281–309.
- Gauthier, Henri (1929). Dictionnaire des Noms Géographiques Contenus dans les Textes Hiéroglyphiques [Dictionary of Toponyms found in the Hieroglyphic Texts] (in French). Vol. 6. Cairo, Kingdom of Egypt: Egyptian Royal Geographic Society.
- Hawkins, John David [in German] (1975). "Ḫilakku". In Edzard, Dietz Otto; Calmeyer, P. [in German]; Moortgat, A.; Otten, H. [in German]; Röllig, Wolfgang [in German]; v. Soden, W.; Wiseman, D. J. (eds.). Reallexikon der Assyriologie und Vorderasiatischen Archäologie [Encyclopaedia of Ancient Near Eastern Studies]. Vol. 4. Berlin, Germany: Walter de Gruyter. pp. 402–403. ISBN 978-3-110-06772-9.
- Hawkins, John D [in German] (2000). Inscriptions of the Iron Age. Part 1: Text, Introduction, Karatepe, Karkamiš, Tell Ahmar, Maraş, Malatya, Commagene. Corpus of Hieroglyphic Luwian Inscriptions. Vol. 1. Berlin, Germany; New York City, United States: Walter de Gruyter. ISBN 978-3-110-10864-4.
- Hawkins, John David [in German] (2008). "Que". In Streck, Michael P. [in German]; Frantz-Szabó, Gabriella; Krebernik, Manfred [in German]; Postgate, J.N.; Seidl, Ursula [in German]; Stol, M.; Wilhelm, Gernot [in German]; Ecklin, Sabine (eds.). Reallexikon der Assyriologie und Vorderasiatischen Archäologie [Encyclopaedia of Ancient Near Eastern Studies] (in German). Vol. 11. Berlin, Germany: Walter de Gruyter. pp. 191–195. ISBN 978-3-110-20383-7.
- Ivantchik, Askold (1993). Les Cimmériens au Proche-Orient [The Cimmerians in the Near East] (PDF) (in French). Fribourg, Switzerland; Göttingen, Germany: Éditions Universitaires (Switzerland); Vandenhoeck & Ruprecht (Germany). ISBN 978-3-727-80876-0.
- Kessler, Karlheinz [in German] (1980). "Illubru". In Edzard, Dietz Otto; Calmeyer, Peter [in German]; Moortgat, A.; Otten, Heinrich [in German]; Röllig, Wolfgang [in German]; von Soden, W.; Wiseman, D. J. (eds.). Reallexikon der Assyriologie und Vorderasiatischen Archäologie [Encyclopaedia of Ancient Near Eastern Studies] (in German). Vol. 5. Berlin, Germany: Walter de Gruyter. p. 60. ISBN 978-3-110-07192-4.
- Kopanias, Konstantinos [in Greek] (2018). "Cilicia and Pamphylia during the Early Iron Age: Hiyawa, Mopsos and the Foundation of the Greek Poleis". Athens University Review of Archaeology. 1. Department of History and Archaeology, National and Kapodistrian University of Athens: 69–95. doi:10.26247/AURA1.4.
- Kryszeń, Adam (2023a). "Adaniya". Hittite Toponyms. University of Mainz; University of Würzburg.
- Kryszeń, Adam (2023b). "Aḫḫiyawa". Hittite Toponyms. University of Mainz; University of Würzburg.
- Lemaire, André (1991). "Recherches de topographie historique sur le pays de Qué" [Historical Topography Research on the Country of Que]. Anatolia antiqua. Eski Anadolu. 1. Institut français des études anatoliennes: 267–275.
- Matessi, Alvise (2025). "10. The Aegean–Anatolian Interface: Overview of the Late Bronze and Iron Age Evidence (ca. 1400–700 BCE)". In Giusfredi, Federico; Matessi, Alvise; Merlin, Stella; Pisaniello, Valerio (eds.). Contacts of Languages and Peoples in the Hittite and Post-Hittite World, Volume 2: The 1st Millennium and the Eastern Mediterranean Interface. Ancient Languages and Civilizations. Leiden, Netherlands: Brill. pp. 213–245. ISBN 978-9-004-72969-8.
- Novák, Mirko [in German] (2010). "Kizzuwatna – Ḥiyawa – Quwe. Ein Abriss der Kulturgeschichte des Ebenen Kilikien" [Kizzuwatna – Ḥiyawa – Quwe. An outline of the cultural history of Plain Cilicia.]. In Becker, Jörg; Ralph, Hempelmann; Rehm, Ellen [in German] (eds.). Kulturlandschaft Syrien. Festschrift für Jan-Waalke Meyer [Syrian Cultural Landscape: Festschrift for Jan-Waalke Meyer]. Alter Orient und Altes Testament. Vol. 371. Münster, Germany: Ugarit-Verlag. pp. 397–425. ISBN 978-3-868-35034-0.
- Novák, Mirko [in German]; Fuchs, Andreas [in German] (2021). "Azatiwada, Awariku from the "House of Mopsos", and Assyria: On the dating of Karatepe in Cilicia". In Payne, Annick; Velhartická, Šárka; Wintjes, Jorit [in German] (eds.). Beyond All Boundaries: Anatolia in the First Millennium BC. Orbis Biblicus et Orientalis. Vol. 295. Leuven, Belgium: Peeters Publishers. pp. 397–466. ISBN 978-9-042-94884-6.
- Oreshko, Rostyslav (2018). "Ahhiyawa - Danu(na). Aegean ethnic groups in the Eastern Mediterranean in the Light of Old and New Hieroglyphic-Luwian Evidence". In Niesiołowski-Spanò, Łukasz [in Polish]; Węcowski, Marek [in Polish] (eds.). Change, Continuity, and Connectivity North-Eastern Mediterranean at the turn of the Bronze Age and in the early Iron Age. Wiesbaden, Germany: Harrassowitz Verlag. pp. 23–56. ISBN 978-3-447-10969-7.
- Pruzsinszky, Regine [in German] (2009). "Sanduarri". In Streck, Michael P. [in German]; Frantz-Szabó, G.; Krebernik, Manfred [in German]; Morandi Bonacossi, D.; Postgate, J. N.; Seidl, Ursula [in German]; Stol, M.; Wilhelm, Gernot [in German] (eds.). Reallexikon der Assyriologie und Vorderasiatischen Archäologie [Encyclopaedia of Ancient Near Eastern Studies] (in German). Vol. 12. Berlin, Germany: Walter de Gruyter. pp. 8–9. ISBN 978-3-110-20384-4.
- Radner, K. (2009). "Sissû". In Streck, Michael P. [in German]; Frantz-Szabó, G.; Krebernik, Manfred [in German]; Morandi Bonacossi, D.; Postgate, J. N.; Seidl, Ursula [in German]; Stol, M.; Wilhelm, Gernot [in German] (eds.). Reallexikon der Assyriologie und Vorderasiatischen Archäologie [Encyclopaedia of Ancient Near Eastern Studies] (in German). Vol. 12. Berlin, Germany: Walter de Gruyter. p. 556. ISBN 978-3-110-20384-4.
- Röllig, Wolfgang [in German] (1971). "Griechen" [Greeks]. In Weidner, Ernst Friedrich; von Soden, Wolfram; Borger, R.; Calmeyer, Peter [in German]; Edzard, D. O.; Falkenstein, A.; Moortgat, A.; Otten, Heinrich [in German]; Röllig, Wolfgang [in German]; Wiseman, D. (eds.). Reallexikon der Assyriologie und Vorderasiatischen Archäologie [Encyclopaedia of Ancient Near Eastern Studies] (in German). Vol. 3. Berlin, Germany: Walter de Gruyter. pp. 643–647. ISBN 978-3-110-03705-0.
- Röllig, Wolfgang [in German] (1983). "Kundu". In Edzard, Dietz Otto; Calmeyer, Peter [in German]; Otten, Heinrich [in German]; Röllig, Wolfgang [in German]; von Schuler, Einar [in German]; von Soden, W.; Wiseman, D. J. (eds.). Reallexikon der Assyriologie und Vorderasiatischen Archäologie [Encyclopaedia of Ancient Near Eastern Studies] (in German). Vol. 6. Berlin, Germany: Walter de Gruyter. p. 341. ISBN 978-3-110-10051-8.
- Röllig, Wolfgang [in German] (1980). "Ionier" [Ionians]. In Edzard, Dietz Otto; Calmeyer, Peter [in German]; Moortgat, A.; Otten, Heinrich [in German]; Röllig, Wolfgang [in German]; von Soden, W.; Wiseman, D. J. (eds.). Reallexikon der Assyriologie und Vorderasiatischen Archäologie [Encyclopaedia of Ancient Near Eastern Studies] (in German). Vol. 5. Berlin, Germany: Walter de Gruyter. p. 150. ISBN 978-3-110-07192-4.
- Simon, Zsolt (2018). "Sapaziti, Sapalulme und die Suppiluliumas von W/Pal(a)stin(a/i)" [Sapaziti, Sapalulme and the Suppiluliumas of W/Pal(a)stin(a/i)]. Altorientalische Forschungen [Ancient Near Eastern Research]. 45 (1). Berlin, Germany: Walter de Gruyter: 122–132. doi:10.1515/aofo-2018-0011.
- Simon, Zsolt (2021). "401 BC: The Year the Neo-Hittite Statehood Ended". In Payne, Annick; Velhartická, Šárka; Wintjes, Jorit [in German] (eds.). Beyond All Boundaries: Anatolia in the First Millennium BC. Orbis Biblicus et Orientalis. Vol. 295. Leuven, Belgium: Peeters Publishers. pp. 675–688. ISBN 978-9-042-94884-6.
- Starke, Frank [in German] (2006). "Asia Minor". In Cancik, Hubert [in German]; Schneider, Helmuth [in German]; Salazar, Christine F.; Möller, Astrid [in German]; Ruppel, Antonia; Warburton, David [in German] (eds.). Brill's New Pauly: Encyclopaedia of the Ancient World. Vol. 2. Leiden, Netherlands; Boston, United States: Brill. pp. 118–130. doi:10.1163/1574-9347_bnp_e614980. ISBN 90-04-12265-6.
- Streck, Michael P. [in German] (2005). "Pirindu". In Edzard, Dietz Otto; Streck, Michael P. [in German]; Krebernik, Manfred [in German]; Postgate, J.N.; Seidl, Ursula [in German]; Stol, M.; Wilhelm, Gernot [in German]; Frantz-Szabó, Gabriella; Hellwag, Ursula (eds.). Reallexikon der Assyriologie und Vorderasiatischen Archäologie [Encyclopaedia of Ancient Near Eastern Studies] (in German). Vol. 10. Berlin, Germany: Walter de Gruyter. pp. 572–573. ISBN 978-3-110-18535-5.
- Täuber, Hans [in German] (2003). "Cilices, Cilicia". In Cancik, Hubert [in German]; Schneider, Helmuth [in German]; Salazar, Christine F.; Möller, Astrid [in German]; Ruppel, Antonia; Warburton, David [in German] (eds.). Brill's New Pauly: Encyclopaedia of the Ancient World. Vol. 3. Leiden, Netherlands; Boston, United States: Brill. p. 329-330. doi:10.1163/1574-9347_bnp_e613620. ISBN 90-04-12259-1.
- Weeden, Mark (2010). "Tuwati and Wasusarma: Imitating the Behaviour of Assyria" (PDF). Iraq. 72. British Institute for the Study of Iraq: 39–61. doi:10.1017/S0021088900000589.
- Weeden, Mark (2017). "Tabal and the Limits of Assyrian Imperialism". In Heffron, Yağmur; Stone, Adam; Worthington, Martin (eds.). At the Dawn of History: Ancient Near Eastern Studies in Honour of J. N. Postgate. Vol. 2. Winona Lake, United States: Eisenbrauns. pp. 721–736. ISBN 978-1-57506-471-0.
- Weeden, Mark (2023). "The Iron Age States of Central Anatolia and Northern Syria". In Radner, Karen; Moeller, Nadine; Potts, Daniel T. (eds.). The Age of Assyria. The Oxford History of the Ancient Near East. Vol. 4. New York City, United States: Oxford University Press. pp. 912–1026. ISBN 978-0-190-68763-2.
- Weeden, Mark; Taniguchi, Junko (2024). Hawkins, John David [in German] (ed.). Corpus of Hieroglyphic Luwian Inscriptions: Volume 3: Inscriptions of the Hittite Empire and New Inscriptions of the Iron Age. Berlin, Germany: De Gruyter. ISBN 978-3-11077899-1.
- Yakubovich, Ilya (2015). "Phoenician and Luwian in Early Iron Age Cilicia". Anatolian Studies. 65: 35–53. doi:10.1017/S0066154615000010.
- Younger, K. Lawson Jr. (2009). "Two Epigraphic Notes on the New Katumuwa Inscription from Zincirli". MAARAV, A Journal for the Study of the Northwest Semitic Languages and Literatures. 16 (2). Western Academic Press: 159–179. doi:10.1086/MAR200916202.
- Zoroğlu, Levent (1994). "Cilicia Tracheia in the Iron Age: the Khilakku Problem". In Çilingiroğlu, A. [in Turkish]; French, D.H. (eds.). Anatolian Ages 3: The Proceedings of the Third Anatolian Iron Ages Colloquium held at Van, 6-12 August 1990. London, United Kingdom: British Institute at Ankara. pp. 301–309. ISBN 978-1-912-09069-3.
