= Cybistra =

Town of ancient Cappadocia

- Karahöyük (Turkish)
- Ḫubišna
- Location within Turkey
- 37.662456°N 34.226824°E
- Location: Turkey
- Region: Konya Province

Cybistra or Kybistra, earlier known as Ḫubišna, was a town of ancient Cappadocia or Cilicia.

Kybistra/Ḫubišna was the capital of a Luwian-speaking Neo-Hittite kingdom in the 1st millennium BCE.

== Location ==
Cybistra was likely located at the site of Ereğli Karahöyük near modern-day Ereğli, or possibly at Ereğli itself.

Another proposed location for Cybistra is Tont Kalesi, 26 km south-west of Ereğli Karahöyük, due to the fact that Tont Kalesi is located in an important strategic location controlling the southern frontier to the south of Tuwanuwa through which the Mediterranean region could be access from the Konya Plain via the Taurus Mountains.

== Name ==
The name of the city was recorded during the Old Assyrian Colony Period as Ḫabušna (Old Assyrian Akkadian: 𒄷𒁉𒅖𒈾).

The name of the city was Ḫūpišna (𒌷𒄷𒌋𒁉𒅖𒈾, 𒌷𒄷𒁉𒅖𒈾, 𒌷𒄷𒁉𒌍𒈾, 𒌷𒄷𒄫𒈾) or Ḫapušna (𒌷𒄩𒁍𒍑𒈾) during the Hittite Empire.

The city appears in Neo-Assyrian records under the names:

- Ḫubišna (𒆳𒄷𒁉𒅖𒈾),
- Ḫubušna (𒆳𒄷𒁍𒍑𒈾),
- and Ḫubušnu (𒆳𒄷𒁍𒍑𒉡).

During Classical Antiquity, the city became known as Cybistra (Ancient Greek: Κύβιστρα, romanized: Kúbistra; Latin: Cybistra).

== History ==
The Hittite Empire, with Ḫūpišna located in the Lower Land.

=== Bronze Age ===
==== Middle Bronze Age ====
Before the Hittite period, Ḫūpišna was a strategic hub guarding the northern end of the Cilician Gates going south to Tarsus.

According to the Telepinu Proclamation, Ḫūpišna was one of the places which the 17th century BCE founder-king of the Hittite Old Kingdom, Labarna I, had conquered and over which he had subsequently appointed his sons as rulers.

During the 16th century BCE, the late Hittite Old Kingdom king Ammuna carried out several military campaigns to attempt to re-subjugate former states which had revolted against Hittite suzerainty, including Ḫūpišna.

==== Late Bronze Age ====
Ḫūpišna was mentioned in the texts of the Hittite Empire, as a country located in southern Anatolia, in the part of the Lower Land corresponding to the later Classical Tyanitis.

The prayer of Muwatalli II contained a list of the gods worshipped in Ḫūpišna, including Huwaššana, who was also called ^{D}GAZ.BA.A.A., as well as Zababa of Ḫūpišna, the Weather-God of Ḫūpišna, the Mountain Šarlaimi, various masculine and feminine deities, and the mountain and springs of Ḫūpišna.

=== Iron Age ===
𒆳𒄷𒁉𒅖𒈾 (Ḫubišna)
- c. 12th century BCE ?–c. 7th century BCE ?
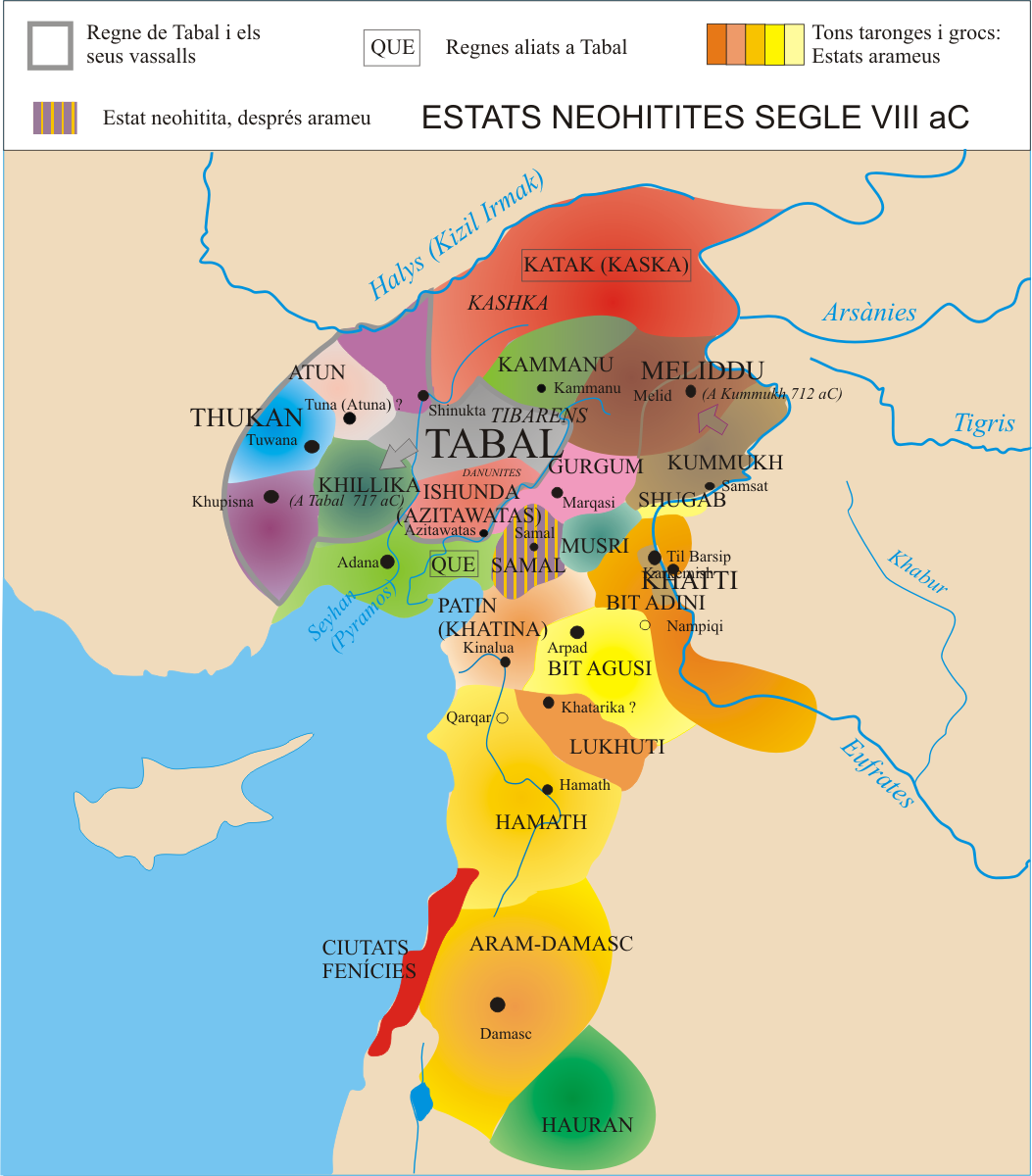
- Ḫubišna (in purple) among the Neo-Hittite states.

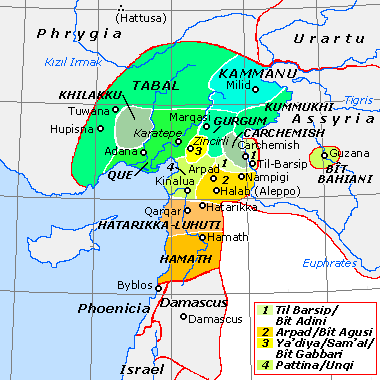
- Tabal among the Neo-Hittite states. Ḫubišna (Hupisna) was one of the constituent states of Tabal.
- Capital: Ḫubišna
- Common languages: Luwian
- Religion: Luwian religion
- King
  - c. 836 BCE: Puḫame
  - c. 737 BCE: Uirimmi
- Historical era: Iron Age
  - Late Bronze Age collapse: c. 12th century BCE ?
  - Disestablished: c. 7th century BCE ?
Preceded by
Hittite empire
- Today part of: Turkey

==== Kingdom of Ḫubišna ====
After the collapse of the Hittite Empire, Ḫubišna became one of the Neo-Hittite states of the region of Tabal, in whose southern regions it was located.

Iron II. Little is known about the kingdom of Ḫubišna. The king Puḫame of Ḫubišna did not initially submit to the Neo-Assyrian king Shalmaneser III (r. 859 – 824 BCE) after 24 other kings of the Tabalian region submitted to him following his attack on the kingdom of Tabal proper during his campaign there in 837 or 836 BCE. Puḫame became a tributary of Shalmaneser III only after he passed through the kingdom and capital of Ḫubišna.

By c. 738 BC, the Tabalian region, including Ḫubišna, had become a tributary of the Neo-Assyrian Empire, either after the Neo-Assyrian king Tiglath-pileser III's (r. 745 – 727 BCE) conquest of Arpad over the course of 743 to 740 BC, causing the states of the Tabalian region to submit to him, or possibly as a result of a campaign of Tiglath-pileser III in Tabal.

Therefore, the king Uirimmi of Ḫubišna was mentioned in the records of the Neo-Assyrian Empire as one of five kings who offered tribute to Tiglath-Pileser III in 738 and 737 BCE.

In 679 BCE, the Assyrian king Esarhaddon (r. 681 – 669 BCE) defeated the Cimmerians and killed their king Teušpa at Ḫubišna. Esarhaddon appears to have reached Ḫubišna by passing through the Göksu River valley and bypassing the Anti-Taurus Mountains and Tabal proper.

===== List of rulers =====
- ᵐPuḫame (Neo-Assyrian Akkadian: 𒁹𒁍𒄩𒈨), r. c. 837 BCE
- ᵐUirimmi (Neo-Assyrian Akkadian: 𒁹𒌑𒄿𒊑𒈪), r. c. 740 BCE

=== Classical Age ===
Strabo, after mentioning Tyana, says "that not far from it are Castabala and Cybistra, forts which are still nearer to the mountain," by which he means Taurus. Cybistra and Castabala were in that division of Cappadocia which was called Cilicia. Strabo makes it six days' journey from Mazaca to the Pylae Ciliciae, through Tyana, which is about half way; then he makes it 300 stadia, or about two days' journey, from Tyana to Cybistra, which leaves about a day's journey from Cybistra to the Pylae. William Martin Leake observed, "We learn also from the Table that Cybistra was on the road from Tyana to Mazaca, and sixty-four Roman miles from the former." Ptolemy places Cybistra in Cataonia.

When Cicero was proconsul of Cilicia (51/50 BCE), he led his troops southwards towards the Taurus through that part of Cappadocia which borders on Cilicia, and he encamped "on the verge of Cappadocia, not far from Taurus, at a town Cybistra, to defend Cilicia, and at the same time hold Cappadocia. Cicero stayed five days at Cybistra, and on hearing that the Parthians were a long way off that entrance into Cappadocia, and were hanging on the borders of Cilicia, he immediately marched into Cilicia through the Pylae of the Taurus, and came to Tarsus. This is quite consistent with Strabo.

According to the Res Gestae Divi Saporis, Cybistra was among the Roman cities claimed by Shapur I to have been captured during his campaign in Anatolia following the defeat and capture of Emperor Valerian in AD 260.

In the Tabula Peutingeriana, Cybistra appears as a station on the central Anatolian Roman road network between Mazaca Caesarea and Tyana, at a recorded distance of 9 units.

=== Byzantine ===
Cybistra was a suffragan see of the Metropolis of Tyana, together with Phaustinoupolis and Sasima.

== Bishopric ==
Cybistra was from an early stage a Christian bishopric, as shown by the participation of its bishop Timotheus in the First Council of Nicaea in 325. Cyrus took part in the Council of Chalcedon in 351 and was a signatory of the letter that the bishops of the Roman province of Cappadocia Secunda, to which Cybistra belonged, sent in 458 to Byzantine Emperor Leo I the Thracian after the murder of Proterius of Alexandria. The diocese no longer appears in Notitiae Episcopatuum from the end of the 15th century.

No longer a residential bishopric, Cybistra is today listed by the Catholic Church as a titular see.

=== List of titular bishops ===
- Nicasio Balisa y Melero, O.A.R. (14 January 1941 to 3 February 1965)
- Jacques-Antoine-Claude-Marie Boudinet (11 March 1856 to 16 June 1856)
- Philippe François Zéphirin Guillemin, M.E.P. (8 August 1856 to 5 April 1886)
- Eduard Herrmann (Hermann) (30 August 1901 to 3 March 1916)
- Johannes Baptist Katschthaler (4 June 1891 to 17 December 1900)
- Paul Nègre (7 December 1916 to 7 February 1940)
- Alexander Paterson (14 May 1816 to 30 October 1831)
- Martin Poell, O.F.M. (20 June 1890 to 2 January 1891)

== Sources ==
- Adalı, Selim Ferruh (2023). "The Phantom Menace? The Chronology of Cimmerian Expeditions, Territories and Zones of Influence in Anatolia". In Draycott, Catherine M.; Branting, Scott; Lehner, Joseph W.; Özarslan, Yasemin (eds.). From Midas to Cyrus and Other Stories: Papers on Iron Age Anatolia in Honour of Geoffrey and Françoise Summers. BIAA Monograph Series. London, United Kingdom: British Institute at Ankara. pp. 209–228. ISBN 978-1-912-09011-2.
- Aro, Sanna (2013). "Tabal". In Streck, Michael P. [in German]; Frantz-Szabó, Gabriella; Krebernik, Manfred [in German]; Bonacossi, D. Morandi; Postgate, J. N.; Seidl, Ursula [in German]; Stol, M.; Wilhelm, Gernot [in German] (eds.). Reallexikon der Assyriologie und Vorderasiatischen Archäologie [Encyclopaedia of Ancient Near Eastern Studies] (in German). Vol. 13. Berlin, Germany; New York City, United States: Walter de Gruyter. pp. 388–391. ISBN 978-3-110-30715-3.
- Aro, Sanna (2023). "Vanishing kingdoms: Tabal and Tuwana during the seventh century BC". In Draycott, Catherine M.; Branting, Scott; Lehner, Joseph W.; Özarslan, Yasemin (eds.). From Midas to Cyrus and Other Stories: Papers on Iron Age Anatolia in Honour of Geoffrey and Françoise Summers. BIAA Monograph Series. London, United Kingdom: British Institute at Ankara. pp. 113–135. ISBN 978-1-912-09011-2.
- Bryce, Trevor (2009). The Routledge Handbook of the Peoples and Places of Ancient Western Asia: From the Early Bronze Age to the Fall of the Persian Empire. London, United Kingdom: Routledge. ISBN 978-0-415-39485-7.
- Bryce, Trevor (2012). The World of the Neo-Hittite Kingdoms: A Political and Military History. Oxford, United Kingdom: Oxford University Press. ISBN 978-0-199-21872-1.
- Kessler, K. [in German] (1975). "Ḫupišna". In Edzard, Dietz Otto; Calmeyer, P. [in German]; Moortgat, A.; Otten, H. [in German]; Röllig, Wolfgang [in German]; v. Soden, W.; Wiseman, D. J. (eds.). Reallexikon der Assyriologie und Vorderasiatischen Archäologie [Encyclopaedia of Ancient Near Eastern Studies] (in German). Vol. 4. Berlin, Germany; New York City, United States: Walter de Gruyter. p. 500. ISBN 978-3-110-06772-9.
- Kryszeń, Adam (2023a). "Ḫapušna". Hittite Toponyms. University of Mainz; University of Würzburg.
- Kryszeń, Adam (2023b). "Ḫupišna". Hittite Toponyms. University of Mainz; University of Würzburg.
- Levine, L.D. (1975). "Ḫupišna". In Edzard, Dietz Otto; Calmeyer, P. [in German]; Moortgat, A.; Otten, H. [in German]; Röllig, Wolfgang [in German]; v. Soden, W.; Wiseman, D. J. (eds.). Reallexikon der Assyriologie und Vorderasiatischen Archäologie [Encyclopaedia of Ancient Near Eastern Studies] (in German). Vol. 4. Berlin, Germany; New York City, United States: Walter de Gruyter. pp. 500–501. ISBN 978-3-110-06772-9.
- Maner, Çiğdem (2017). "Searching for Ḫupišna Hittite Remains in Ereğli Kara Höyük and Tont Kalesi". In Alparslan, Metin (ed.). Hatti and the East: Proceedings of an International Workshop on Hittite Historical Geography in Istanbul, 25th-26th October 2013. Places and Spaces in Hittite Anatolia. Vol. 1. Istanbul, Turkey: Turkish Institute of Ancient Sciences. pp. 101–114. ISBN 978-605-9680-48-6.
- Weeden, Mark (2010). "Tuwati and Wasusarma: Imitating the Behaviour of Assyria". Iraq. 72. British Institute for the Study of Iraq: 39–61. doi:10.1017/S0021088900000589.
- Weeden, Mark (2017). "Tabal and the Limits of Assyrian Imperialism". In Heffron, Yağmur; Stone, Adam; Worthington, Martin (eds.). At the Dawn of History: Ancient Near Eastern Studies in Honour of J. N. Postgate. Vol. 2. Winona, United States: Eisenbrauns. pp. 721–736. ISBN 978-1-57506-471-0.
- Weeden, Mark (2023). "The Iron Age States of Central Anatolia and Northern Syria". In Radner, Karen; Moeller, Nadine; Potts, Daniel T. (eds.). The Age of Assyria. The Oxford History of the Ancient Near East. Vol. 4. New York City, United States: Oxford University Press. pp. 912–1026. ISBN 978-0-190-68763-2.
