= Zeitschrift für Assyriologie und vorderasiatische Archäologie =

- Discipline: Ancient Near East
- Language: German, English, French
- Edited by: Walther Sallaberger

Publication details
- Former name: Zeitschrift für Assyriologie und verwandte Gebiete. Fachzeitschrift der Deutschen Morgenländischen Gesellschaft
- History: Since January 1, 1886
- Publisher: De Gruyter (Germany)
- Frequency: 2 issues per year

Standard abbreviations
- ISO 4: Z. Assyriol. Vorderasiat. Archäol.

Indexing
- ISSN: 0084-5299 (print); 1613-1150 (web)

Links
- Journal homepage

The Journal of Assyriology and Near Eastern Archaeology (German: Zeitschrift für Assyriologie und vorderasiatische Archäologie, Zeitschrift für Assyriologie or ZA for short) is a journal specializing in Near Eastern archaeology.

The Zeitschrift für Assyriologie publishes scholarly articles and reviews from the fields of Ancient Near Eastern Studies, Near Eastern Archaeology and related disciplines. Its primary focus is the philology of the ancient Near Eastern languages written in cuneiform, however, contributions to the archaeology of these regions are also regularly published. The period covered ranges from the 4th to the 1st millennium BCE.

The journal has been published annually in two volumes by Walter de Gruyter since its first issue. Originally titled Zeitschrift für Assyriologie und verwandte Gebiete. Fachzeitschrift der Deutschen Morgenländischen Gesellschaft ('Journal for Assyriology and Related Fields, Journal of the German Oriental Society'), it was founded by Carl Bezold and first appeared in 1886. From volume 35 onward, the journal was published in a new series beginning with volume 1. In 1939, the journal, which by then also included more archaeological articles, was renamed Zeitschrift für Assyriologie und vorderasiatische Archäologie ('Journal for Assyriology and Near Eastern Archaeology'). In 1970, with volume 60, the original volume numbering system was reinstated. Articles are published in German, English, and French. Since 1974, Altorientalische Forschungen, a similar journal, also publishes for ancient Near Eastern studies and Near Eastern archaeology; ZA has since concentrated on the cultures native to Mesopotamia, while AoF is dedicated to the other regions of the ancient Near East (Anatolia, Iran, Syria, Levant, but also Egypt).

The publication of cuneiform tablets are often referred to by their "ZA" number.

== Editors ==
- 1886–1922: Carl Bezold
- 1924–: Heinrich Zimmern
- 1933–1936: Benno Landsberger
- 1938–: Paul Koschaker and Wolfram von Soden
- …
- 1950–1966: Adam Falkenstein
- …
- 1982–2000: Dietz-Otto Edzard
- Since 2001: Walther Sallaberger
