= Awarikus =

Awarikkus or Warikkas
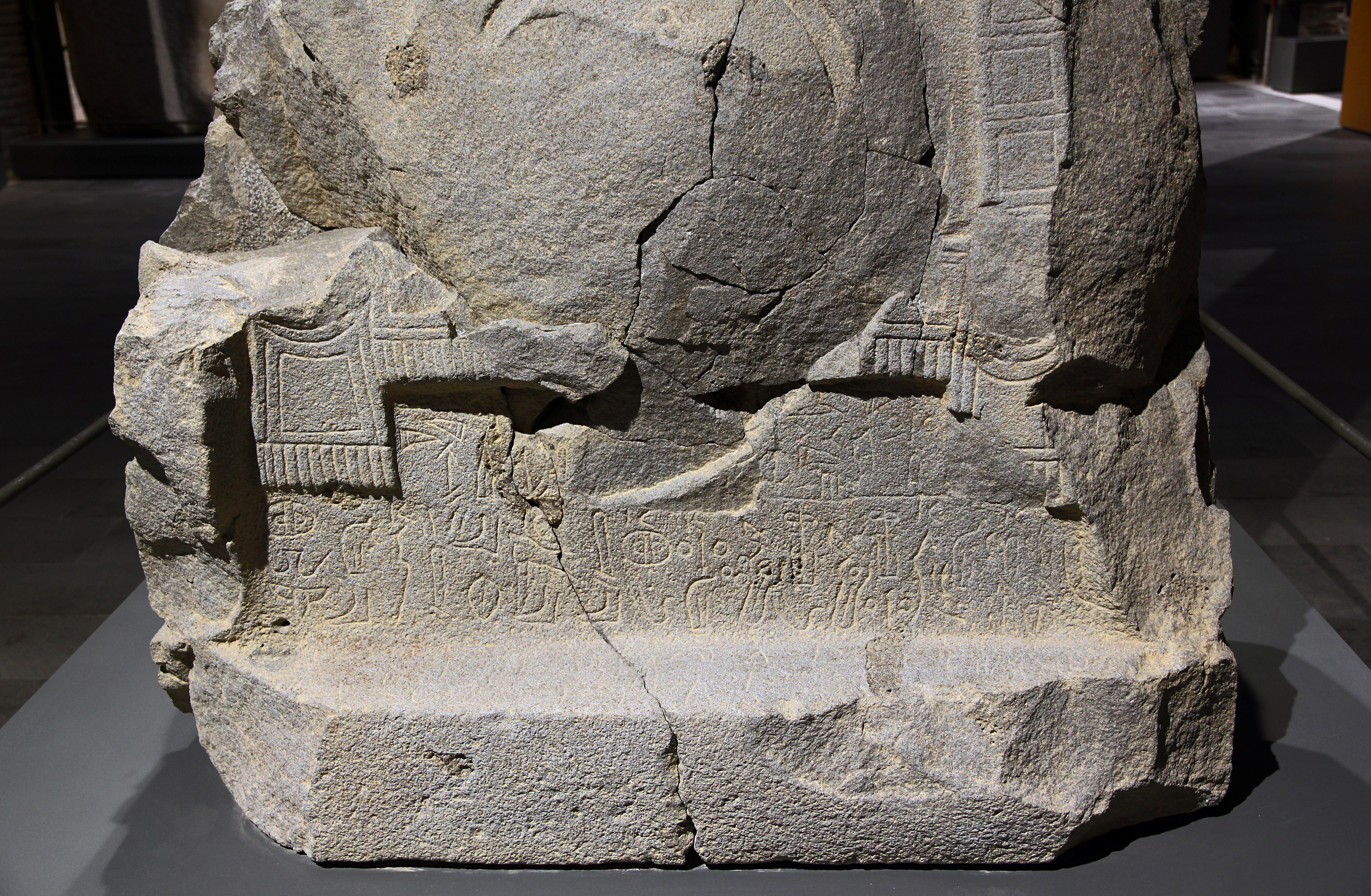
- Çineköy inscription of Awarikkus/Warikkas. First line reads "I am Warikkas"; In Hieroglyphic Luwian: 𔐀𔖻 𔗬𔖱𔓯𔗧𔗦, romanized: ammu=mi Warikkas

King of Ḫiyawa
- Reign: r. c. 738 – 709 BCE
- Successor: Ḫiyawa annexed by Neo-Assyrian Empire
- Died: 709 BCE ?
- Issue: At least one son
- Luwian: 𔐓𔗬𔗜𔗔 (Awarikkus) or 𔗬𔖱𔓯𔗧𔗦 (Warikkas)
- Akkadian: 𒁹𒌑𒊑𒅅𒆠 ᵐUrikki
- House: House of Muksas
- Religion: Luwian religion

Awarikus (Hieroglyphic Luwian: 𔐓𔗬𔖱𔗜𔗔) or Warikas (Hieroglyphic Luwian: 𔗬𔖱𔓯𔗧𔗦) was a king of the Neo-Hittite kingdom of Ḫiyawa in Cilicia who reigned during the mid to late 8th century BCE, from around c. 738 to 709 BCE.

== Name ==
The name of this king is attested in Anatolian hieroglyphs in the forms 𔐓𔗬𔖱𔗜𔗔 (Awarikkus) and 𔗬𔖱𔓯𔗧𔗦 (Warikkas).

=== Etymology ===
The name Awarikkus/Warikkas is not Luwian, and several etymologies have been proposed for it, including a Hurrian one and various Greek ones:

- one proposal is that the various forms go back to a unique form *Awarikas;
- another suggestion is that:
  - 𔐓𔗬𔗜𔗔 was pronounced Awarkus and represented an Ancient Greek name Euarkhos (Εὔαρχος) or *Ewarkhos (*Εϝαρχος), meaning "fit for rule,"
  - while 𔗬𔖱𔓯𔗧𔗦 corresponded to the Cypriot name recorded in Greek as Rhoikos (Ῥοῖκος) and wo-ro-i-ko (𐠵𐠦𐠂𐠍), meaning "crooked" and "lame";
- yet another proposal is that the name was derived from Greek *Wrakios (*Ϝρακιος) > Rhakios (Ῥάκιος), attested in Mycenaean Greek as *Wroikiōn (Mycenaean Greek: 𐀺𐀫𐀒𐀍, romanized: wo-ro-ko-jo).

=== Other attestations ===
==== In Phoenician ====
The name Awarikkus referred to in the Karatepe and Çineköy inscriptions as ʾWRK (𐤀𐤅𐤓𐤊), and Warikkas is referred to in the Hasanbeyli and Cebelireis Daǧı inscriptions as WRYK (𐤅𐤓𐤉𐤊) and in the İncirli inscription as WRYKS (𐤅𐤓𐤉𐤊𐤎).

==== In Akkadian ====
Awarikkus or Warikkas is referred to in Neo-Assyrian inscriptions as ᵐUrikki (𒁹𒌑𒊑𒅅𒆠)) and ᵐUriaikki (𒁹𒌑𒊑𒅀𒅅𒆠).

== Identification ==
The scholars Trevor Bryce, Max Gander and John David Hawkins consider Warikas and Awarikus to be the same individual, while Zsolt Simon considers them to be different kings.

The scholars Stephen Durnford and Max Gander consider Awarikus/Warikas to be different from the king WRYK of the Cebelireis Daǧı inscription, whom they identify as a later ruler who reigned in the 7th century BCE, while Mirko Novák and Andreas Fuchs consider the king of the Cebelireis Daǧı inscription to have been identical with Awarikus/Warikas.

== Life ==
Awarikus claimed descent from one Muksas (Hieroglyphic Luwian: 𔑾𔗧𔗔𔗔), who is also referred to in his Phoenician language inscriptions as MPŠ (𐤌𐤐𐤔), and also appears in Greek sources under the name of Mopsos (Μόψος) as a legendary founder of several Greek settlements across the coast of Anatolia during the early Iron Age. This suggests that Awarikus belonged to a dynasty which had been founded by a Greek colonist leader.

=== Reign ===
Awarikus became a vassal of the Neo-Assyrian Empire during the rule of its king Tiglath-pileser III, who listed him as one of his tributaries in 738 BCE.

Awarikus remained loyal to the Neo-Assyrian Empire during conflicts opposing it to Arpad, Gurgum, Kummuh, Samʾal and Urartu, in exchange of which Tiglath-pileser III rewarded him with lands belonging to Arpad, Samʾal and Gurgum.

Awarikus seems to have remained a loyal vassal of the Neo-Assyrian Empire throughout most of his reign, thanks to which he was able to reign in Ḫiyawa for a very long period until throughout the rules of Tiglath-pileser III and his successor Shalmaneser V, and was still reigning when Sargon II became the king of the Neo-Assyrian Empire.

Ḫiyawa under Awarikus likely cooperated with the Neo-Assyrian forces during Tiglath-pileser III's campaign in the Tabalian region in 729 BCE.

In his inscription from his later reign, Awarikus claimed to have enjoyed good relations with his overlord, the Neo-Assyrian king Sargon II, with Awarikus's relation with Sargon II appearing to have been an alliance or partnership through a treaty according to which Sargon II was the protector and suzerain of Awarikus. According to this inscription, Awarikus had a very close relationship with Sargon II, and he declared that Sargon II himself and the Neo-Assyrian royal dynasty had become "a mother and father" to him and that the peoples of Ḫiyawa and Assyria had "become one house."

According to this same inscription, Awarikus had built 15 fortresses in the west and east of Ḫiyawa.

Assuming the king WRYK of the Cebelires Daǧı inscription was the same as Awarikus of Ḫiyawa, his kingdom might have extended to the western limits of Rough Cilicia and nearly reached Pamphylia, and would thus have included Ḫilakku.

At one point during his reign, Awarikus promoted a certain Azzattiwadas to a position of authority subordinate to the crown, although exact details of Azzattiwadas's exact rank have so far not survived. According to Azzattiwadas's own inscriptions, he was a servant of Baʿal and the King, and he was "father and mother," that is the de facto ruler, of the whole kingdom of Ḫiyawa.

==== Monuments ====
An inscription by Awarikus is known from the site of Çineköy, located about 30 kilometres to the south of his capital of Adanawa.

Other monuments of Awarikus include a stela from İncirli and a border stone from Hasanbeyli.

=== Under direct Neo-Assyrian rule ===
After Sargon II's son-in-law and vassal, the king Ambaris of Bīt-Burutaš, had rebelled against the Neo-Assyrian Empire in 713 BCE, he deposed Ambaris and annexed Bīt-Burutaš.

As part of his reorganisation of the Anatolian possessions of the Neo-Assyrian Empire after the annexation of Bīt-Burutaš, in 713 BCE itself Sargon II imposed a Neo-Assyrian governor on Ḫiyawa who also had authority on Bīt-Burutaš, as well as on the nearby kingdoms of Ḫilakku and Tuwana.

Under this arrangement, Awarikus became subordinate to Aššur-šarru-uṣur, who was the first governor of Que, as Ḫiyawa was called in the Neo-Assyrian Akkadian language. Thus, Awarikus was either reduced to the status of a token king or deposed and demoted to a lower position such as an advisor of the governor, while Aššur-šarru-uṣur held all the effective power although the Neo-Assyrian administration sought to preserve, for diplomatic purposes, the illusion that Awarikus was still the ruler of Ḫiyawa in partnership with Aššur-šarru-uṣur.

Thus Ḫiyawa and other nearby Anatolian kingdoms were placed the authority of Aššur-šarru-uṣur. Following the appointment of Aššur-šarru-uṣur, Awarikus of Ḫiyawa and Warpalawas II of Tuwana became largely symbolic rulers although they might have still held the power to manage their kingdoms locally.

The reason for these changes was due to the fact that, although Awarikus and Warpalawas II had been loyal Neo-Assyrian vassals, Sargon II considered them as being too elderly to be able to efficiently uphold Neo-Assyrian authority in southeastern Anatolia, where the situation had become volatile because of encroachment by the then growing power of Phrygian kingdom.

=== Deposition ===
The appointment of Aššur-šarru-uṣur as his superior might have led to tensions between him and Neo-Assyrian power: Awarikus had likely been left disillusioned with Neo-Assyrian rule after his long period of loyal service to the Neo-Assyrian Empire. Therefore, Awarikus might have attempted to rebel against the Neo-Assyrian Empire, and thus in 710 or 709 BCE he sent an embassy composed of fourteen delegates to Urartu to negotiate with the Urartian king in preparation for his rebellion.

This embassy was however intercepted by the king Midas of Phrygia, who was seeking a rapprochement with the Neo-Assyrian Empire and therefore handed it over to Aššur-šarru-uṣur.

Awarikus was consequently deposed, and possibly executed, by the Neo-Assyrian Empire for attempting to revolt, after which Ḫiyawa was annexed into the Neo-Assyrian Empire as the province of Que, and Aššur-šarru-uṣur was given full control of Que, which merely formalised the powers that he had already held.

The exact fate of Awarikus is however unknown, and he might already have been dead by the time that Midas handed over his delegation to Assur-sarru-usur, hence why no mention of punishing him appears in the Neo-Assyrian records.

Alternatively, Awarikus's conspiracy with Urartu had already been uncovered sometime between 727 and 722 BCE and he was deposed and executed during the reign of Shalmaneser V itself, while his emissaries fled to the court of Midas in Phrygia and remained there in exile for some years, until they were delivered into Neo-Assyrian hands only after Midas had aligned with the Neo-Assyrian Empire in 710/709 BCE.

=== Legacy ===
In 705 BCE, Sargon II campaigned against the Cimmerians in Tabal, where he died in battle against a Tabalian ruler called Gurdî of Kulummu. Following Sargon II's death, the Neo-Assyrian Empire lost control of its Anatolian territories, which descended into a state of chaos.

Among the territories which were destabilised in the aftermath of Sargon II's death in battle was Ḫiyawa, where Awarikus's subordinate Azzattiwadas organised a significant military force to restore authority throughout the kingdom by expelling possible Cimmerian or Phrygian invaders. As part of his efforts to protect Ḫiyawa, Azzattiwadas built a series of fortifications throughout the kingdom similar to how his overlord had done, one of which was a hill-top fortified settlement named Azzattiwadaya (Hieroglyphic Luwian: 𔐔𔖪𔑣𔗬𔐬𔓱; Phoenician: 𐤀𐤆𐤕𐤅𐤃𐤉, romanized: ʾZTWDY) after himself. Azzattiwadas also claimed to have expanded the territory of Ḫiyawa, to which he declared having brought prosperity, as well as filled the granaries of the city of Paḫar and replenished the grazing lands with sheep and goats.

These actions of Azzattiwadas were done in the name of the House of Muksas, which he restored to power by placing Awarikus's son on the throne of Ḫiyawa.

==== Modern ====
Azzattiwadas's Karatepe inscription would later be used to decipher the Anatolian Hieroglyphic script in the modern period.

== Sources ==
- Bryce, Trevor (2009). The Routledge Handbook of the Peoples and Places of Ancient Western Asia: From the Early Bronze Age to the Fall of the Persian Empire. London, United Kingdom: Routledge. ISBN 978-0-415-39485-7.
- Bryce, Trevor (2012). The World of The Neo-Hittite Kingdoms: A Political and Military History. Oxford, United Kingdom: Oxford University Press. ISBN 978-0-199-21872-1.
- Bryce, Trevor (2016). "The land of Hiyawa (Que) revisited". Anatolian Studies. 66: 67–79. doi:10.1017/S0066154616000053.
- Çambel, Halet; Röllig, Wolfgang [in German]; Hawkins, John D. [in German] (1999). Corpus of Hieroglyphic Luwian Inscriptions: Volume 2: Karatepe-Arslantaş: The Inscriptions: Facsimile Edition. Berlin, Germany; New York City, United States: Walter de Gruyter. ISBN 978-3-110-87975-9.
- DeGrado, Jessie (2022). "Azatiwada's Empire: Adapting Assyrian Imagery in the Bilingual Karatepe Inscription". News from the Lands of the Hittites. 5–6. Mimesis Edizioni: 21–45.
- Durnford, Stephen P. B. (2021). "On some Late Helladic migrants into Anatolia named in Hittite and Luwian sources, their migration to Iron Age Cilicia and their return to Greece in legend". ARAMAZD: Armenian Journal of Near Eastern Studies. 15 (1–2): 43–127. doi:10.32028/ajnes.v15i1-2.1300.
- Gander, Max (2012). "Aḫḫiyawa – Ḫiyawa – Que: Gibt es Evidenz für die Anwesenheit von Griechen in Kilikien am Übergang von der Bronze- zur Eisenzeit" [Aḫḫiyawa – Ḫiyawa – Que: Is there Evidence of the Presence of Greeks in Cilicia during the Transition from the Bronze Age to the Iron Age?]. Studi Micenei ed Egeo-Anatolici [Mycenaean and Aegean-Anatolian Studies]. 54: 281–309.
- Hawkins, John D [in German] (2000). Inscriptions of the Iron Age. Part 1: Text, Introduction, Karatepe, Karkamiš, Tell Ahmar, Maraş, Malatya, Commagene. Corpus of Hieroglyphic Luwian Inscriptions. Vol. 1. Berlin, Germany; New York City, United States: Walter de Gruyter. ISBN 978-3-110-10864-4.
- Hawkins, John David [in German] (2008). "Que". In Streck, Michael P. [in German]; Frantz-Szabó, Gabriella; Krebernik, Manfred [in German]; Postgate, J.N.; Seidl, Ursula [in German]; Stol, M.; Wilhelm, Gernot [in German]; Ecklin, Sabine (eds.). Reallexikon der Assyriologie und Vorderasiatischen Archäologie [Encyclopaedia of Ancient Near Eastern Studies] (in German). Vol. 11. Berlin, Germany: Walter de Gruyter. pp. 191–195. ISBN 978-3-110-20383-7.
- Hawkins, J.D. [in German] (2014). "Urikki". In Streck, Michael P. [in German]; Frantz-Szabó, Gabriella; Krebernik, Manfred [in German]; Bonacossi, D. Morandi; Postgate, J. N.; Seidl, Ursula [in German]; Stol, M.; Wilhelm, Gernot [in German] (eds.). Reallexikon der Assyriologie und Vorderasiatischen Archäologie [Encyclopaedia of Ancient Near Eastern Studies] (in German). Vol. 14. Berlin, Germany; New York City, United States: Walter de Gruyter. p. 416. ISBN 978-3-110-41761-6.
- Kopanias, Konstantinos [in Greek] (2018). "Cilicia and Pamphylia during the Early Iron Age: Hiyawa, Mopsos and the Foundation of the Greek Poleis". Athens University Review of Archaeology. 1: 69–95. doi:10.26247/AURA1.4.
- Novák, Mirko [in German]; Fuchs, Andreas [in German] (2021). "Azatiwada, Awariku from the "House of Mopsos", and Assyria: On the dating of Karatepe in Cilicia". In Payne, Annick; Velhartická, Šárka; Wintjes, Jorit [in German] (eds.). Beyond All Boundaries: Anatolia in the First Millennium BC. Orbis Biblicus et Orientalis. Vol. 295. Leuven, Belgium: Peeters Publishers. pp. 397–466. ISBN 978-9-042-94884-6.
- Weeden, Mark (2023). "The Iron Age States of Central Anatolia and Northern Syria". In Radner, Karen; Moeller, Nadine; Potts, Daniel T. (eds.). The Age of Assyria. The Oxford History of the Ancient Near East. Vol. 4. New York City, United States: Oxford University Press. pp. 912–1026. ISBN 978-0-190-68763-2.
- Weeden, Mark; Taniguchi, Junko (2024). Hawkins, John David [in German] (ed.). Inscriptions of the Hittite Empire and New Inscriptions of the Iron Age. Corpus of Hieroglyphic Luwian Inscriptions. Vol. 3. Berlin, Germany: De Gruyter. ISBN 978-3-11077899-1.
- Yakubovich, Ilya (2015). "Phoenician and Luwian in Early Iron Age Cilicia". Anatolian Studies. 65: 35–53. doi:10.1017/S0066154615000010.

Awarikkus or Warikkas House of Muksas
Regnal titles
Unknown	King of Ḫiyawa c. 738-709 BCE	Succeeded by Aššur-šarru-uṣur as Neo-Assyrian governor of Que
