= Reallexikon der Assyriologie und Vorderasiatischen Archäologie =

Encyclopedia of Assyriology and Near Eastern Archaeology
- Author: 585 individual authors.
- Original title: Reallexikon der Assyriologie und Vorderasiatischen Archäologie
- Language: German, English
- Discipline: Assyriology and Ancient Near East Studies
- Publisher: De Gruyter
- Published: 1928-2018
- No. of books: 15
- Website: https://publikationen.badw.de/en/rla

The Encyclopedia of Assyriology and Near Eastern Archaeology (German: Reallexikon der Assyriologie und Vorderasiatischen Archäologie; formerly Reallexikon der Assyriologie, RlA for short) is a multi-language (English, German, and French) encyclopedia on the Ancient Near East. It was founded by Bruno Meissner in 1922, reformed in 1966 by editor Ruth Opificius and publisher Wolfram von Soden. The lead editor was Dietz Otto Edzard from 1972 to 2004, with Michael P. Streck taking over in 2005.

A team of 585 different authors from many countries have been involved in the project, producing 15 volumes, the latest of which was published in 2018.

Not to be confused with the Akkadisches Handwörterbuch (AHw).

== Publication History ==
The idea for the RlA came to the Berlin Assyriologist Bruno Meissner in 1922. He recognized that Assyriology lacked a reference work comparable to Pauly's Encyclopedias and the Reallexikon der Vorgeschichte ('Encyclopedia of Prehistory'). Meissner found interested collaborators in his Berlin colleague Erich Ebeling and in the publishing house Walter de Gruyter, which already published the Zeitschrift für Assyriologie. It took another six years before the first fascicle was published.

Initially, the editors planned to publish two volumes totaling 1600 pages, but the rapidly growing body of new knowledge necessitated an expansion of the project. By 1938, the first two volumes had been published, comprising 974 pages, but they had only reached the letter "E". A total of 35 authors (including Arthur Ungnad) had worked on the RlA up to that point, all but two (an Italian and a Slovenian) coming from Germany. The language of the entire project was German. Ebeling alone contributed almost 20 percent of all entries. During the WWII and the immediate postwar years, work on the encyclopedia could not be continued. At the first Rencontre Assyriologique in Paris in 1950, Adam Falkenstein stated that the continuation of the work could only be undertaken within an international framework.

At the second such event a year later, Alfred Pohl stated that a continuation of the old RlA was no longer possible, as many of the articles were outdated and the rights to the encyclopedia belonged to the publisher. Furthermore, the articles should now also be written in English and French. Only the headwords should remain entirely in German or, in the case of a complete relaunch, be written in English. Pohl anticipated a duration of approximately ten years, during which 150 authors would produce eight to ten volumes. UNESCO was to finance the project, which was to cover all cuneiform cultures. Many scholars, such as Falkenstein and Jean Nougayrol, expressed skepticism, as there was only a small number of researchers, who were already occupied with processing various new finds, such as those from Mari. Ultimately, a preparatory commission for a new encyclopedia was established, comprising Édouard Dhorme, Erich Ebeling, Henri Frankfort, Albrecht Götze, Franz de Liagre-Böhl, and Alfred Pohl.

A year later, the issue was up for debate again. There were proponents of continuing the old encyclopedia and proponents of a new, English-language Encyclopédie des cunéiformes. In a vote, scholars voted 27 to 22 in favor of continuing the old encyclopedia. Finally, in 1957, the first fascicle of the third volume was published. The editor was Margarethe Falkner Weidner, who in some cases still had to rely on old, and in some cases even outdated, pre-war manuscripts. Nevertheless, she was able to expand and internationalize the circle of authors. René Labat wrote the first article in French, "Fever," which was subsequently translated into German. The title, which until then had been simply Reallexikon der Assyriologie ('Encyclopedia of Assyriology'), was expanded to Reallexikon der Assyriologie und Vorderasiatischen Archäologie ('Encyclopedia of Assyriology and Near Eastern Archaeology') to reflect the development of research.

In 1966, Wolfram von Soden became the editor, and Ruth Opificius became the editor. Von Soden restructured the encyclopedia into its current form. The single editor was replaced by an editorial board. Furthermore, editors were appointed for specific subject areas, and trilingualism was introduced. For example, the article "Gesetze" (Laws) by Guillaume Cardascia was published in French for the first time. By this time, 73 authors from 14 countries (Canada, Czechoslovakia, Germany, England, Finland, France, the Netherlands, Iraq, Italy, Yugoslavia, Austria, Sweden, Switzerland, and the USA) were working on the RlA.

In 1972, von Soden handed over the editorship to Dietz-Otto Edzard, who had been a co-editor since 1966. The editorial office, which had previously been based in Münster, moved to Munich, where the Hittitologist Gabriella Frantz-Szabó was hired as the full-time editor. During Edzard's editorship, seven volumes with over 4,000 pages (covering the letters H to P) were published by 2005. The letter L alone (420 articles) was contributed by 68 authors from 15 countries. On average, each letter comprises 500 pages, which is twice the number of pre-war volumes. Funding was provided by the German Research Foundation (DFG) until 1986, and subsequently by the Bavarian Academy of Sciences and Humanities. After Edzard's death in 2004, Michael P. Streck became the new editor of the RlA. The editorship thus moved from Munich to Leipzig. Gabriella Frantz-Szabó headed the editorial team until 2006; in the following years, various other staff members were employed for the project.

The project was originally financially secured until 2011. However, at the end of 2011, the authors still had the letters T to Z to complete. Therefore, the Bavarian Academy of Sciences and Humanities extended the project until 2017, and the final fascicle of the complete work was published in 2018. Following the successful completion of the project, the volumes of the Reallexikon der Assyriologie have been available online as PDF files via the Bavarian Academy of Sciences and Humanities' publication server since 2019 and can be searched using the lemma list.

== Bibliography ==
- Vol. 1: A – Bepašte. Edited by Erich Ebeling and Bruno Meissner. 1928.
- Vol. 2: Ber – Ezur and Addenda. Edited by Erich Ebeling and Bruno Meissner. 1938.
- Vol. 3: Fable – Gyges and Addendum. Edited by Erich Ebeling and Bruno Meissner. 1971.
- Vol. 4: Ha-a-a – Hystaspes. Edited by Otto Edzard Dietz. 1972.
- Vol. 5: Ia… – Kizzuwatna. Edited by Otto Edzard Dietz. 1980.
- Vol. 6: Klagegesang – Lebanon. Edited by Otto Edzard Dietz. 1983.
- Vol. 7: Libanukšabaš – Medicine. Edited by Dietz Otto Edzard. 1987.
- Vol. 8: Meek – Mythology. Edited by Dietz Otto Edzard. 1997.
- Vol. 9: Nab – Nuzi. Edited by Dietz Otto Edzard. 1998.
- Vol. 10: Oannes – Priest Disguise. Edited by Dietz Otto Edzard and Michael P. Streck. 2005.
- Vol. 11: Prince, Princess – Samug. Edited by Erich Ebeling, Ernst F. Weidner, and Michael P. Streck. 2008.
- Vol. 12: Šamuḫa – Spider. Edited by Michael P. Streck. 2011.
- Vol. 13: Spiders – Zoo. Edited by Michael P. Streck. 2013.
- Vol. 14: Tiergefäß – Waša/ezzil(i). Edited by Michael P. Streck. 2016.
- Vol. 15: Washing – Cypress, Selected Addenda, Index. Edited by Michael P. Streck. 2018.
