= Altorientalische Forschungen =

- Discipline: Ancient Near East studies
- Language: German, English, French

Publication details
- History: Since June 20, 1975
- Publisher: De Gruyter (Switzerland)
- Frequency: Biannual

Standard abbreviations
- ISO 4: Altorient. Forsch.

Indexing
- ISSN: 0232-8461 (print); 2196-6761 (web)

Links
- Journal homepage

Ancient Near Eastern Studies (German: Altorientalische Forschungen; AoF for short) is a German academic journal for ancient Near Eastern studies and Near Eastern archaeology.

Altorientalische Forschungen was founded in 1974 and published by the Central Institute for Ancient History and Archaeology at the German Academy of Sciences at Berlin. Initially, the journal served to cover all areas of ancient Near Eastern studies and Near Eastern archaeology. Following German reunification, a reorientation took place in 1994. Since the Zeitschrift für Assyriologie was already published in Germany and primarily dedicated to the cultures of Mesopotamia, Altorientalische Forschungen was henceforth to focus primarily on the cultures of ancient Anatolia, but also ancient Syria and adjacent regions such as ancient Egypt (including ancient Sudan), the eastern Mediterranean, and Iran. The journal covers languages, history, culture, and archaeology. For many years, the editors were Volkert Haas, in collaboration with Manfred Bietak, Helmut Freydank, Karl Jansen-Winkeln, Horst Klengel, Johannes Renger, and Werner Sundermann; later, Jörg Klinger and Jared Miller took over. The current editors are Joost Hazenbos, Catherine Mittermayer, Mirko Novák, and Claudia Suter. The editorial office is located at the Institute of Archaeological Sciences at the University of Bern, and Sabine Ecklin is the editor-in-chief.

From its inception, the journal was published by Akademie Verlag in Berlin, and since 2014 by De Gruyter. Two issues are published annually, forming a single volume. The main languages of publication are German and English, with French also appearing. The journal primarily publishes articles. AoF is not a review journal. In exceptional cases, individual issues or entire volumes may be published as special editions. For example, all four issues of volumes 24/25 (1997 and 1998) were dedicated to articles commemorating Horst Klengel's 65th birthday.
