= AHW (disambiguation) =

AHW may refer to:

- Atomic hydrogen welding, an arc welding process that uses an arc between two metal tungsten electrodes in a shielding atmosphere of hydrogen
- Aeromist-Kharkiv, an airline based in Kharkiv, Ukraine
- Ahnapee and Western Railway, a common carrier short line railroad in northeastern Wisconsin
- Advanced Hypersonic Weapon, a DARPA project
- Akkadisches Handwörterbuch (AHw), a German lexicon of the Akkadian language
- A. H. Wheeler, Indian publishing company
