= Akkadisches Handwörterbuch =

The Akkadisches Handwörterbuch (full title Akkadisches Handwörterbuch: unter Benutzung des lexikalischen Nachlasses von Bruno Meissner (1868-1947)) is a German lexicon of Akkadian language by Wolfram von Soden, often abbreviated as "AHw." This book is a standard work for study of the Ancient Near East. It complements the Reallexikon der Assyriologie, or RLA (which is an encyclopedia rather than a lexicon, with entries on Assyriological topics rather than on Akkadian words), founded by Bruno Meissner and reformed in 1966 by editor Ruth Opificius and publisher Wolfram von Soden. AHw was partially based on the lexicographical work (the lexical "Nachlass") of Bruno Meissner, including a manuscript covering about the first half of the letters, and was published in installments from 1959 to 1981. The lexicon was originally intended to be published in only two volumes, but the amount of material ended up necessitating a third. The final product, published by Harrassowitz Verlag, comprises the volumes A-L (1965, 2nd ed. 1985), M-S (1972), and Ṣ-Z (with addenda) (1981).
The original fascicles (Lieferungen) are as follow:

- Volume I (Band I)
  - 1 (1959): a - ašium, pp. i-xvi, 1-80
  - 2 (1959): alkadu - dunnamû, pp. 81–176
  - 3 (1960): dunnānu - gabû, pp. 177–272
  - 4 (1962): gadādu - ikkibu(m), pp. 273–368
  - 5 (1963): ikkillu(m) - katāmu(m), pp. 369–464
  - 6 (1965): katappātu - luwwû, pp. 465–565
- Volume II (Band II)
  - 7 (1966): ma- - mû, pp. 566–664
  - 8 (1967): mû - našpartu(m), pp. 665–760
  - 9 (1969): našpāru(m) - pessû(m), pp. 761–856
  - 10 (1971): pessûtu - ramû(m), pp. 857–952
  - 11 (1972): ramû(m) - s/ṣ/zuwar, pp. 953–1064
- Volume III (Band III)
  - 12 (1974): ṣaʾānu - šāmūtum, pp. 1065–1166
  - 13 (1976): šāmutu(m) - šubšulu(m), pp. 1167–1256
  - 14 (1977): šubtu(m) - tēšû(m), pp. 1257–1352
  - 15 (1979): tēšû - uzuzzu, pp. 1353–1448
  - 16 (1981): uzzapnannu - zaratu, corrigenda and addenda, pp. i-xvi, 1449-1592

The major English language lexicon of Assyrian is the Chicago Assyrian Dictionary, CAD. A Concise Dictionary of Akkadian, CDA, published in 1999, edited by Jeremy Black, Andrew George, and Nicholas Postgate, is a smaller, English lexicon based largely on AHw.
