= Stefan Maul =

German Assyriologist

Stefan Mario Maul (born 24 December 1958 in Aachen) is a German Assyriologist and holder of the Gottfried Wilhelm Leibniz Prize.

== Life ==
Maul studied Assyriology, Near Eastern Archaeology and Egyptology at the Georg-August-Universität Göttingen, where he received his doctorate as a student of Rykle Borger in 1987. From 1987 to 1992 he worked as a research assistant and until 1995 as an assistant at the FU Berlin, where he habilitated in 1993. Since 1995 he is Ordinarius for Assyriology at the Ruprecht-Karls-Universität Heidelberg

Since 2004 Maul has headed the research unit of the Heidelberg Academy of Sciences "Edition of literary cuneiform texts from Assur".

He has also been a member of the scientific advisory board of the Deutschen Orient-Gesellschaft since 1994, a corresponding member since 1995 and a member of the central management of the Deutsches Archäologisches Institut since 2001. In 1997 he was awarded the Gottfried Wilhelm Leibniz Prize for his research activities. In 1998 he became a full member of the Heidelberg Academy of Sciences, in 2003 a corresponding member of the Göttingen Academy of Sciences and in 2012 a member of the Deutschen Akademie der Naturforscher Leopoldina.

== Publications ==
- Zukunftsbewältigung: eine Untersuchung altorientalischen Denkens anhand der babylonisch-assyrischen Löserituale (Namburbi) at Zabern, Mainz 1994, ISBN 3-8053-1618-6.
- Weinen aus Trauer. Der Tod des Enkidu. In Claus Ambos, Stephan Hotz, Gerald Schwedler, Stefan Weinfurter: Die Welt der Rituale. Von der Antike bis heute. Wiss. Buchges, Darmstadt 2005, ISBN 3-534-18701-6, p. 22.
- Die Inschriften von Tall Taban (Grabungskampagnen 1997–1999). Die Könige von Tabetu und das Land Mari in mittelassyrischer Zeit. Tokio, Kokushikan Univ., Inst. for Cultural Studies of Ancient Iraq 2005.
- Das Gilgamesch-Epos. newly translated and commented by Stefan M. Maul. 6th edition. Munich, Beck 2014, ISBN 978-3-406-52870-5.
- Die Wahrsagekunst im alten Orient. Beck, Munich 2013, ISBN 978-3-406-64514-3.
