= Bruno Meissner =

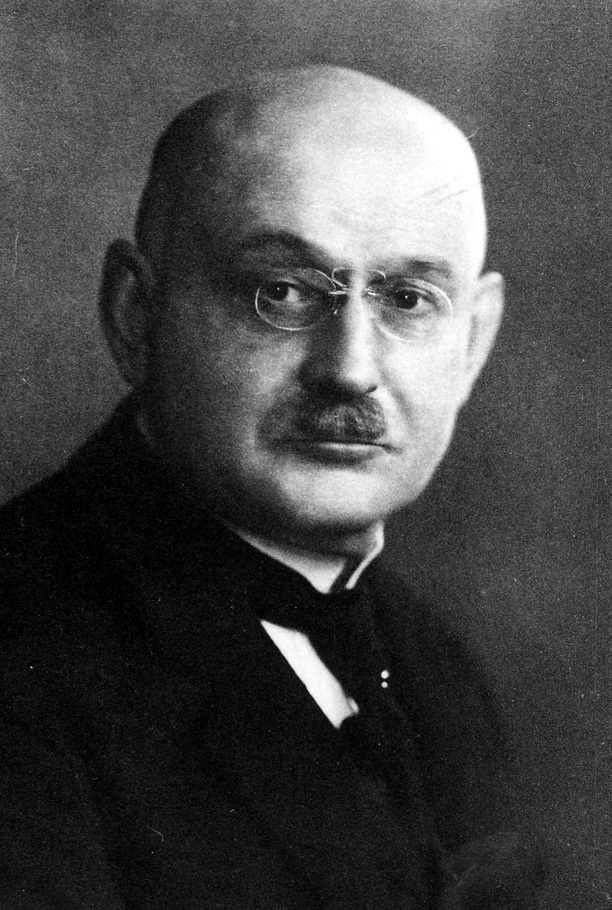
Bruno Meissner

Bruno Meissner also Bruno Meißner (25 April 1868, in Graudenz – 13 March 1947, in Zeuthen) was a German assyriologist.

From 1904 to 1921 Meissner was professor at the University of Breslau, then from 1921 professor of assyriology at the University of Berlin. His main work on Babylonian and Assyrian cuneiform texts appeared in 1920 and 1925 in two volumes. He also authored a major text with Dietrich Opitz on the palace of Nineveh.

He originated the Reallexikon der Assyriologie and papers from his legacy form a large part of Wolfram von Soden's Akkadisches Handwörterbuch (abbv. AHw). 3 vols (A-L, M-S, S-Z).

== Works ==
- Bruno Meissner, Friedrich Delitzsch (1898). Assyrisches Handwörterbuch. 1896 (ATLA monograph preservation program). E.J. Brill. p. 137. ISBN 9780837085975.
- Supplement zu den Assyrischen Wörterbüchern, E. J. Brill, Leiden 1898.
- Kurzgefaßte Assyrische Grammatik, Hinrichs, Leipzig 1907 (Hilfsbücher zur Kunde des Alten Orients, vol. 3).
- Babylonien und Assyrien, 2 vols., Winter, Heidelberg 1920 and 1925.
- Beiträge zum assyrischen Wörterbuch, 2 vols., The University of Chicago Press, Chicago 1931 and 1932.
