= Dietrich Opitz =

Dietrich Opitz (13 January 1901 – 2 January 1992) was a German assyriologist and colleague of Bruno Meissner. He was the first to propose that Tell el Fakhariya was the location of Wassuganni, capital of the Hurrian kingdom of Mitanni from c.1500 BC. though this is now considered unlikely. Opitz was born in Berlin and died, aged 90, in Potsdam.

== Works ==
- Eine Form der Ackerbestellung in Assyrien ZA 37 nF 3 (1927):
- Ein Altar des Konigs Tukulti-Ninurta 1. von Assyrien, AfO, 7 (1931), 83–90.
- Der geschlachtete Gott
- Das Problem des Burney-Reliefs
