= Werner Sundermann =

German scholar of Iranian studies (1935–2012)

Werner Sundermann (December 23, 1935 – October 12, 2012) was a German philosopher and Iranologist. He is remembered for his studies in Iranian languages and Manichaeism: in particular, he discovered the exact etymology of the term Tajik, which, according to him, comes from a Parthian pronunciation of the Arabic word Ṭāya (Syriac: Ṭayāyē).

== Life ==
Sundermann was born in Thale, Germany. He studied Iranian studies at the Humboldt University in Berlin, in 1963 he was awarded a doctorate in philosophy with his dissertation "The Sasanian Ruler's Legitimation and its Conditions".

Sundermann did not want to join the Socialist Unity Party of Germany (Sozialistische Einheitspartei Deutschlands, SED), and he worked in the Turfan Research Group of the German Academy of Sciences at Berlin.

In 1985 he became a corresponding member of the Istituto italiano per il Medio ed Estremo Oriente in Rome, in 1988 a member of the North Rhine-Westphalian Academy of Sciences and in 1989 a foreign member of the Danish Academy of Sciences.

After the political change in the GDR, he became a member of the Academia Europaea in 1990 and an honorary lecturer at the Humboldt University. In 1991 he was elected a corresponding member of the British Academy. From 1992 Sundermann was an honorary professor at the Free University of Berlin and since 1993 director of the Turfan research group.

Sundermann was an extraordinary member of the Berlin-Brandenburg Academy of Sciences. Starting in 2003, he was a corresponding member of the Bavarian Academy of Sciences. In 1994 he was awarded an honorary doctorate from the University of Bologna.

He died in Berlin in 2012.
