= Riekele Borger =

Dutch and German assyriologist (1929–2010)

Riekele or Rykle Borger (born 24 May 1929, Wiuwert, the Netherlands; died 27 December 2010, Göttingen, Germany) was a notable Dutch Assyriologist educated in the German tradition. He was the protégé of Wolfram von Soden, and taught as professor in the Seminar für Keilschriftforschung (Seminar for Cuneiform Studies) at the University of Göttingen, Germany.

Most famous for his cuneiform sign lists, Borger also published the important work Handbuch der Keilschriftliteratur, a detailed overview of all the published books and articles related to Assyriology that were available at the time. Up until his death, Borger was working on an updated version. His self-study method for Akkadian script and language, Babylonisch-Assyrische Lesestücke is, despite its age (1963), still being used and reprinted.

Rykle Borger had been the assistant to Wolfram von Soden during the latter's work on Das Akkadische Handwörterbuch (AHW), one of the foundational works of modern Assyriological philology. This experience led Borger to think of himself as a foundational philologist, and his lifelong commitment was to creating detailed and accurate reference works to support and advance the discipline of Assyriology. At Göttingen, Borger trained a number of notable students, Professors Stefan Maul (University of Heidelberg), and Andreas Fuchs (University of Tübingen), among them. An American student, Dr. Donald G. Schley, contributed to Prof. M.E.J. Richardson's (University of Manchester) production of the English edition of the Koehler-Baumgartner Hebrew-Aramaic Lexikon of the Old Testament (Leiden: E.J. Brill, 1994). At Borger's behest, Schley also translated Wolfram von Soden's Einführung in die Altorientalistik into English (The Ancient Orient: An Introduction to the Study of the Ancient Near East; Eerdmans, 1994)--the only contribution of Borger's mentor available in English. Thus, Borger sought to further foundational philological work among his students and to support the distribution of the work of his mentor, von Soden. Wilfred Lambert of the University of Birmingham, author of the notable anthology, Babylonian Wisdom Literature (1960), and one of the leading cuneiform experts in the world, was a close associate and collaborator of Borger's.

Rykle Borger was never able to complete his one great ambition—the creation of a Sumero-Akkadian lexicon based solely on the ancient Mesopotamian bilingual texts. Yet he was an indefatigable scholar of ancient Mesopotamian and Semitic languages, and did produce foundational works necessary for the advance of Assyriology as a discipline.

== Selected bibliography ==
- 1963: Babylonisch-Assyrische Lesestücke. Roma: pontificio instituto biblico Roma (2006 ISBN 88-7653-254-4)
- 1975: Handbuch der Keilschriftliteratur (three parts)
- 1988: Assyrisch-babylonische Zeichenliste (out of print since 1995, reworked as Mesopotamisches Zeichenlexikon)
- 2004: Mesopotamisches Zeichenlexikon. Münster: Ugarit-Verlag (2004 ISBN 3-927120-82-0)

Borger's bibliography is listed in: S. Maul, Eine Festschrift für Rykle Borger zu seinem 65. Geburtstag am 24. Mai 1994. Tikip Santakki Mala Bašmu (Cuneiform Monographs, Vol. 10). Leiden: Brill, 1998. ISBN 978-90-56-93010-3 (pp. 359–368).
