= Anton Moortgat =

Belgian archaeologist

Anton Moortgat (21 September 1897 in Antwerp – 9 October 1977 in Damme Belgium) was a Belgian archaeologist. He was the first full professor for the archaeology of the ancient near east in Germany.

== Biography ==
He studied archaeology, classics and ancient history and got his PhD in 1923 under Ferdinand Noack. He worked as a research assistant at the Max Freiherr von Oppenheim-Stiftung in Berlin, and since 1929 in the Ancient Near East department of the National Museums in Berlin.

In 1948, he became a professor at the Free University of Berlin.

In 1955, he had done excavations in Syria.

In 2007, The Museum of the Ancient Near East has dedicated a memorial exhibition to Moortgat, marking the 110th anniversary of his birthday.
