= Çebel Ires Daǧı inscription =

Phoenician inscription found in Turkey

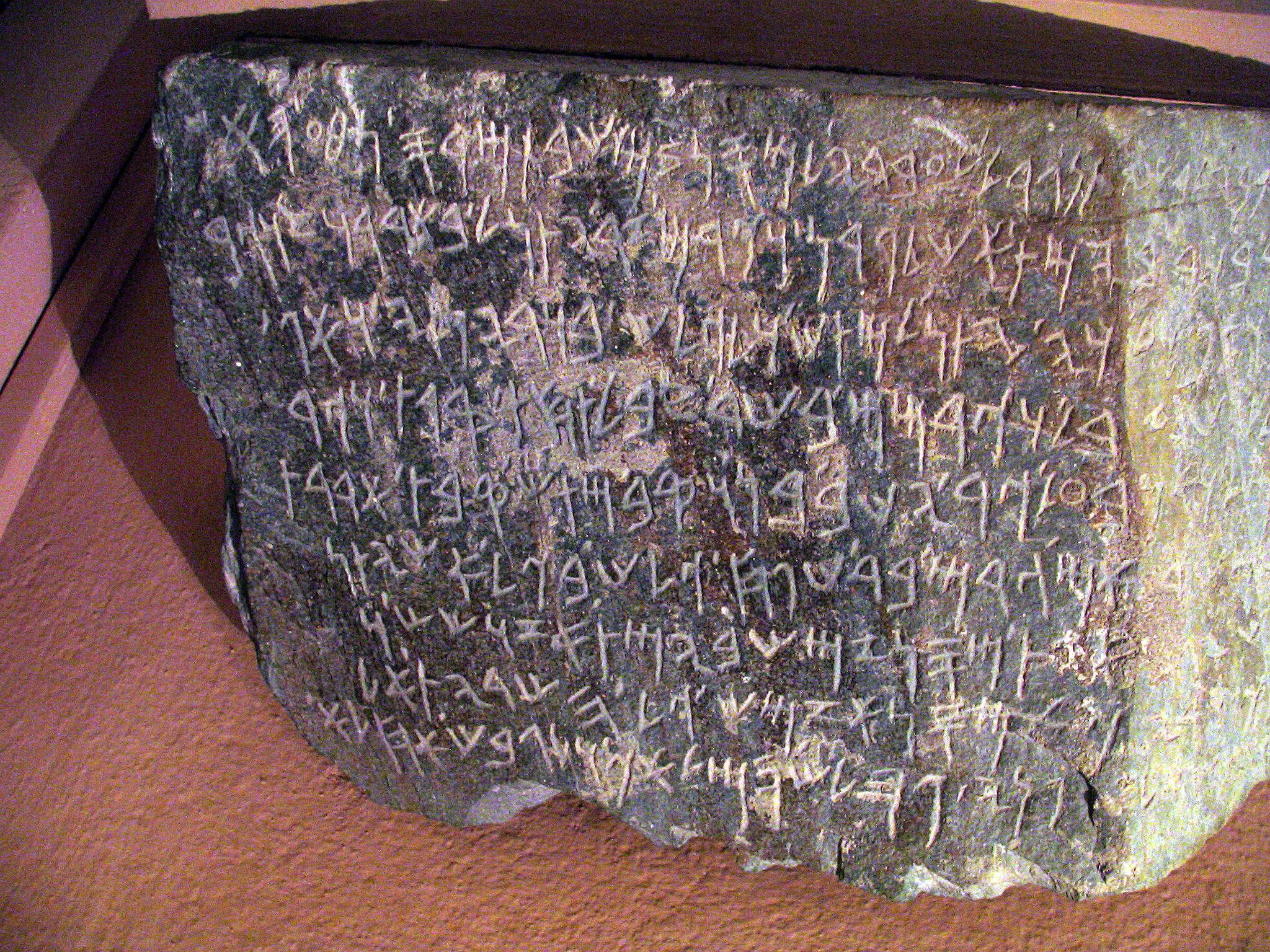
- Created: c. 650 BC
- Discovered: 1980; Antalya, Turkey
- Discovered by: James Russell
- Present location: Antalya, Antalya Province, Turkey
- Language: Phoenician

The Çebel Ires Daǧı inscription is a Phoenician legal inscription on a limestone block found in the ruins of Laertes (Cilicia), on Çebel Ires mountain in southern Turkey. The inscription is held at the Alanya Archaeological Museum.

It was discovered in 1980 by James Russell (of the University of British Columbia, and Mustafa Gürdal, Director of the Alanya Museum, in a secondary context, and is the only inscription considered to date earlier than Roman times found at the site (on paleographic grounds it is thought to date to the second half of the 7th century BC)

The inscription mentions the intervention of a King Warika in a land dispute, a name also known (with slightly different spelling) in the Çineköy inscription and the Karatepe bilingual.

It measures 54 x 31 x 17 cm, likely a fragment of a prism shaped monument – on the three outer edges are 9 lines of Phoenician on two sides and 3 on the top side.

== Bibliography ==
- Mosca, P. G.; J. Russell (1987). Türk Tarih Kurumu (ed.). "A Phoenician Inscription from Cebel Ires Dağı in Rough Cilicia". Epigraphica Anatolica (9–12). R. Habelt: 1–28. ISSN 0174-6545.
- Lemaire, André (1989). "Une Inscription Phénicienne Découverte Récemment et le Mariage de Ruth la Moabite". Eretz-Israel: Archaeological, Historical and Geographical Studies (in French): 124–129. ISSN 0071-108X. JSTOR 23621934.
- Long, G. A. "A Kinsman-Redeemer in the Phoenician Inscription from Cebel Ires Dağı," ZAW 103, 1991: 421–24.
- Long, G. A. and D. Pardee. "Who Exiled whom? Another Interpretation of the Phoenician Inscription of Cebel Ires Dağı," Aula Orientalis 7, 1989: 207–14
- Margalit, B. "Philological Notes on a Recently Published Phoenician Inscription from Southern Anatolia," in Dort ziehen Schiffe dahin... ed. by M. Augustin, K.-D. Schunk, 1996: 119–29.
