= Adam Falkenstein =

German Assyriologist

Adam Falkenstein (17 September 1906 – 15 October 1966) was a German Assyriologist.

He was born in Planegg, near Munich in Bavaria and died in Heidelberg.

== Life ==
Falkenstein studied Assyriology in Munich and Leipzig. He was involved primarily with cuneiform, particularly discoveries in Uruk, and with the Sumerians and their language. From 1930 onward, Falkenstein taught as a professor of Assyriology at the Göttingen University. In 1940 he accepted a teaching assignment at Heidelberg University as a professor of semitic languages. He joined the Nazi Party in 1939. In 1941 he flew to Baghdad with Fritz Grobba when Haj Amin al-Husseini and Rashid Ali al-Gaylani organized a brief, pro-German coup supported by weapons shipments from the German Reich. Afterward he was employed by the German foreign service in Turkey. Nothing is known about his de-nazification.

From 1939 to 1944 he was editor of the professional journal "Orientalische Literaturzeitung"; from 1950 until his death in 1966 he edited the "Zeitschrift für Assyriologie". In the early 1950s he resumed teaching at Heidelberg University.

== Literary works ==
- Literarische Keilschrifttexte aus Uruk (1931)
- Haupttypen der sumerischen Beschwörungen (1931)
- Die archaische Keilschrifttexte aus Uruk (1936)
- Topographie von Uruk (1941)
- Grammatik der Sprache Gudeas von Lagaš (1949-1950)
- Sumerische und Akkadische Hymnen und Gebete (1953, with Wolfram von Soden)
