= Dietz Otto Edzard =

Dietz Otto Edzard (28 August 1930 in Bremen – 2 June 2004 in Munich) was a German scholar of the Ancient Near East and grammarian of the Sumerian language.

Portrait of Dietz Otto Edzard

He was elected a foreign member of the Royal Netherlands Academy of Arts and Sciences in 1976 and an International member of the American Philosophical Society in 1996.

== Works ==
- Sumerian Grammar 2003
- Geschichte Mesopotamiens: Von den Sumerern bis zu Alexander dem Großen 2004
- Gudea and His Dynasty (Royal Inscriptions of Mesopotamia Early Periods) 1997
- "Gilgames und Huwawa" : Zwei Versionen der sumerischen Zedernwaldepisode nebst einer Edition von Version " B " 1993
- Die Orts- und Gewässernamen der präsargonischen und sargonischen Zeit (Beihefte zum Tübinger Atlas des Vorderen Orients. Reihe B) 1977

Among his final works was a 55-page essay on Ancient Babylonian literature and religion published by the Czech Academy of Science in 2005.
