= Wolfram von Soden =

German Assyriologist (1908–1996)

- Born: Wolfram Theodor Hermann Freiherr von Soden; 19 June 1908; Berlin, Kingdom of Prussia, then part of the German Empire
- Died: 6 October 1996 (aged 88); Münster, Germany
- Occupation: Assyriologist

Academic background
- Education: University of Leipzig
- Doctoral advisor: Benno Landsberger

Wolfram Theodor Hermann, Freiherr von Soden (19 June 1908 – 6 October 1996) was a German scholar of Assyriology. Active as a scholar during the Nazi era and World War II, he authored several works, some of which have been interpreted as supporting aspects of Nazi cultural and racial ideology.

== Early life and education ==
Soden was born in Berlin on 19 June 1908. He studied ancient Semitic languages under Benno Landsberger at the University of Leipzig, where he received his doctorate in 1931. His dissertation was titled Der hymnisch-epische Dialekt des Akkadischen, lit. 'The Hymnic-Epic Dialect of Akkadian'.

== Career ==
Soden joined the Sturmabteilung in 1934 and the Nazi Party (NSDAP) in 1937. From 1939 to 1945, he served in the German military, primarily as a translator. In 1936, he was appointed as an associate professor of Assyriology and Arabic Studies at the University of Göttingen after his former teacher Benno Landsberger was forced to leave Germany following the introduction of the Nuremberg Laws implemented by the Nazi regime, which stripped Jewish people of numerous civil rights, including citizenship. In 1940 he was offered the chair in Ancient Near Eastern Studies at Friedrich Wilhelm University, Berlin, but was unable to take it up, owing to his wartime duties in military intelligence.

After the Second World War, Soden's Nazi Party membership initially hindered his academic career. However, with a recommendation from Landsberger (then at the Oriental Institute of the University of Chicago), in 1954 Soden was appointed to an academic position at the University of Vienna, in Austria. In 1961, he accepted a professorship in Münster, where he directed the Oriental seminar until his retirement in 1976. Following his death in 1996, he bequeathed his library to the newly revived Institute of Near Eastern Studies at the University of Leipzig, where he had completed his doctorate.

Soden specialized in ancient Semitic languages. As a member of the History of Religions (Religionsgeschichte) school at the University of Göttingen, he challenged the interpretation that Babylonians regarded their creator god Marduk, as a "dying-and-rising-god." He suggested that texts supporting this view were polemical works created by the Assyrians to criticize the chief god of their rival kingdom.

Soden's philological works include the Akkadisches Handwörterbuch lit. 'Akkadian Dictionary', developed with assistance from Rykle Borger, and the Grundriss Akkadischer Grammatik lit. 'Foundations of Akkadian Grammar', both of which are considered reference works in Assyriology. Soden's work on the Akkadian dictionary has been noted for providing a foundation for later philological projects, such as the Chicago Assyrian Dictionary.

== Controversy ==
Soden's work has been accused of supporting Nazi ideologies. His early works, particularly Der Aufstieg des Assyrreiches als geschichtliches Problem lit. 'The rise of the Assyrian Empire as a historical problem' (1937), have been interpreted by some as promoting "racist concepts of Aryan superiority" over Semitic culture.

For example, in Soden's Leistung und Grenze sumerischer und babylonischer Wissenschaft lit. 'Achievement and Limits of Sumerian and Babylonian Science, 1936', the 1936 first edition concluded at page 556 that, allegedly, "science, in the strict sense of the word, is something that could only be created by the Indo-Europeans, determined by the Nordic race." In the 1965 edition, at page 122, this conclusion was revised to state that "science, in the strict sense of the word, could only take shape under the special conditions provided by the Indo-European Greeks and Indians."

Another book by Soden, Einführung in die Altorientalistik lit. 'The Ancient Orient: An Introduction to the Study of the Ancient Near East' (1985) discusses the skin colour of ancient Near Eastern inhabitants, mentioning the allegedly "presumably always light-skinned inhabitants of the Near East during the Copper Age."

== Death ==
Wolfram von Soden died from natural causes on 6 October 1996 in Münster, Germany.

== Works (partial) ==
- Das akkadische Syllabar (1948, rev. 1967, 1976, 1991, ISBN 88-7653-257-9)
- Grundriss der akkadischen Grammatik (1952, ISBN 88-7653-258-7)
- Das Gilgamesch-Epos (1958, with Albert Schott; ISBN 3-15-007235-2)
- Akkadisches Handwörterbuch (1965–1981, 3 vols; ISBN 3-447-01471-7)
- Das akkadisch-hethitische Vokabular KBo I 44+KBo XIII 1 (1968, with Heinrich Otten)
- Einführung in die Altorientalistik (1985; ISBN 0-8028-0142-0); translated (by Donald G. Schley) into English as The Ancient Orient: An Introduction to the Study of the Ancient Near East. Grand Rapids: Eerdmans, 1994.

== Bibliography ==
- Riekele Borger, "Wolfram von Soden". In: Archiv für Orientforschung 44/45, 1997/98, pp. 588–594.
- Jakob Flygare, "Assyriology in Nazi Germany: the Case of Wolfram von Soden." In 'Perspectives on the History of Ancient Near Eastern Studies.' 2020, p. 44-60. ISBN 978-1-57506-836-7
