= Divine justice (disambiguation) =

Divine justice, or divine law, is a law perceived as deriving from a transcendent source.

Divine Justice may also refer to:

- Divine law
- Attributes of God (disambiguation)
- A theological concept such as the philosophical divine command theory
- Divine Justice (novel), a novel by David Baldacci
- Advent of Divine Justice, a Bahá'í text

== See also ==
- Divine command theory
- Last Judgment
