= Wasusarmas =

Neo-Hittite king from Tabal, ruled 730s BC

Wassu-Sarrumas
- Great King; Hero
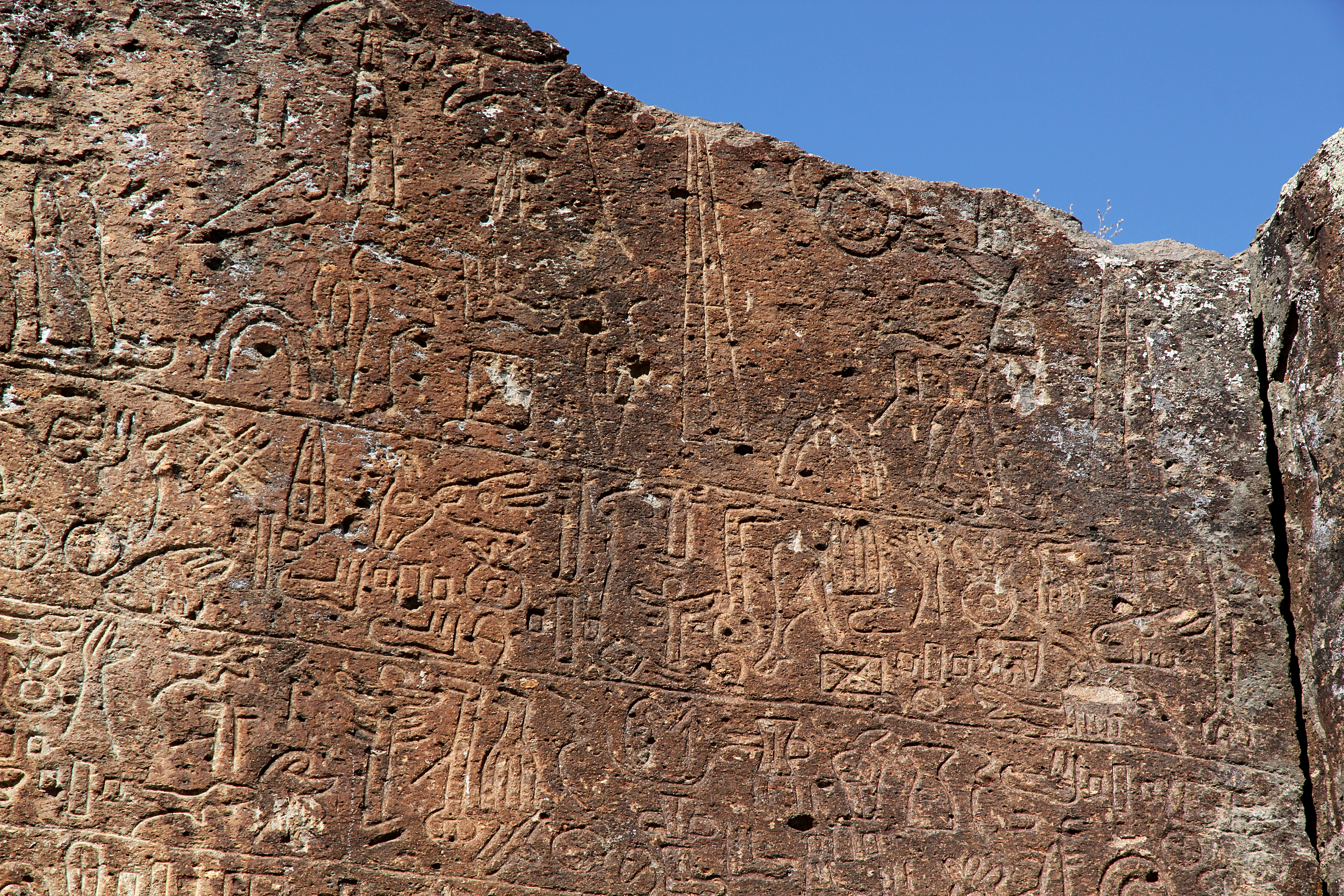
- The Topada inscription of Wasusarmas, 8th c. BC. The first line reads "Great King Wasusarmas, Great King, the Hero, son of Tuwattis, Great King, Hero"; In Hieroglyphic Luwian: 𔐒𔓬𔖢𔑙𔒅𔗔𔐒𔐕𔕬𔓬𔑣𔕣𔐒𔐕𔔹𔗔𔐰, romanized: Uris ḫantawattis Wasusarmas uris ḫantawattis ḫastallis Tuwatti(ya)s uras ḫantawatti(ya)s ḫastalli(ya)s nimuwizzas

Great king of Tabal
- Reign: r. c. 740 BC – 730 BC
- Predecessor: Tuwattis II
- Successor: Ḫullî
- Luwian: 𔓬𔖢𔑙𔒅𔗔; Wassu-Sarrumas
- Akkadian: 𒁹𒌑𒊍𒋩𒈨 ᵐWassurme or ᵐUassurme
- House: Dynasty of Tuwattis I (?)
- Father: Tuwattis II
- Religion: Luwian religion

Wasusarmas (Hieroglyphic Luwian: 𔓬𔖢𔑙𔒅𔗔, romanized: Wassu-Sarrumas) was a king of the Neo-Hittite kingdom of Tabal proper in the broader Tabalian region who reigned during the mid-8th century BC, from around c. 740 BC to c. 730 BC.

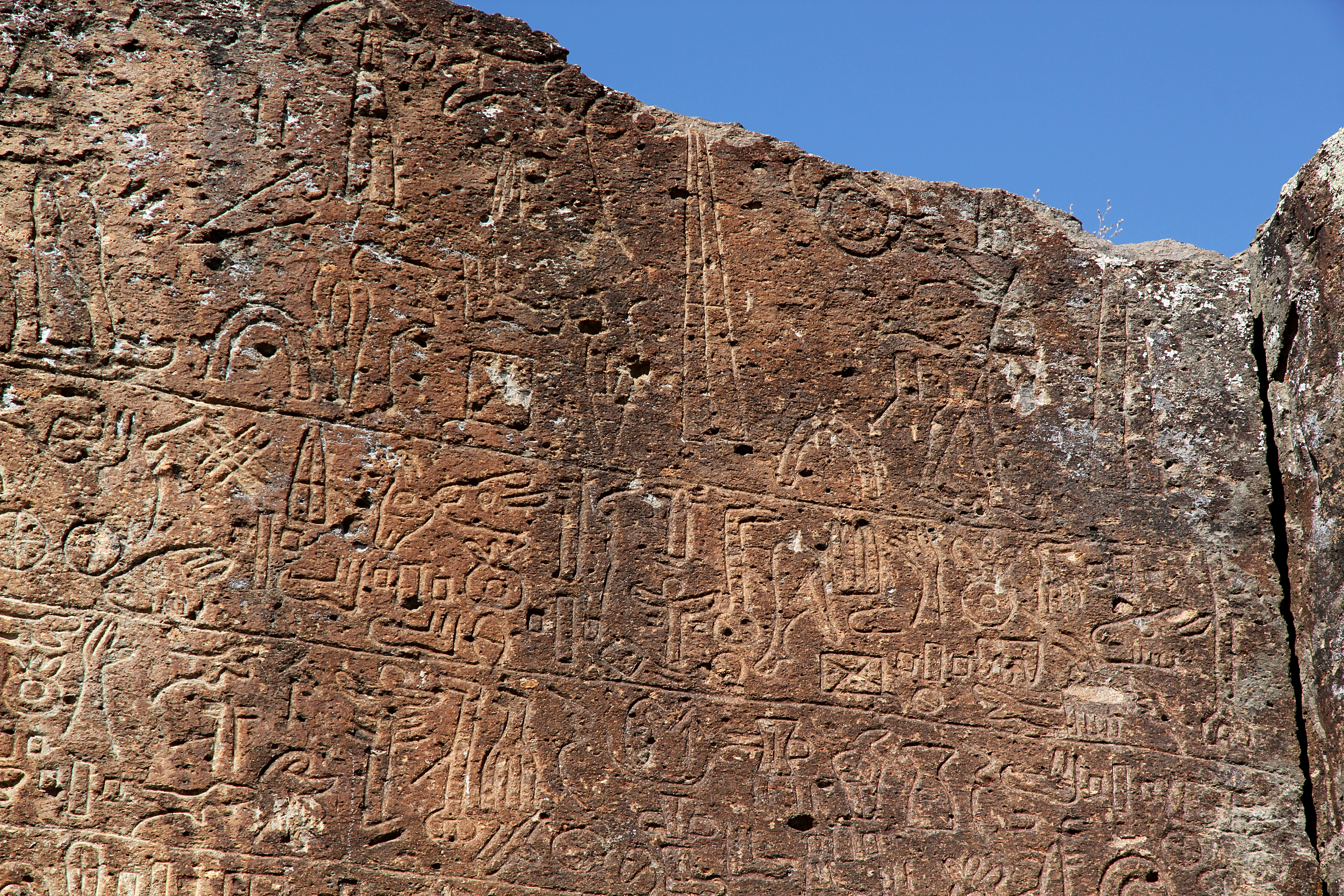
Name and title of Wasusarma (top line from the right)

== Name ==
=== Pronunciation ===
The Luwian name 𔓬𔖢𔑙𔒅𔗔 was pronounced as Wassu-Sarrumas.

=== Etymology ===
The name Wassusarmas was theophoric in nature, and was composed of the name of the Hurrian god Šarruma, to which was prefixed the Luwian term wāšu, meaning lit. 'good', and which was itself a cognate of Palaic wāsu- (𒉿𒀀𒋗), meaning lit. 'well', and of Sanskrit vásu- (वसु) and Avestan vohu- (𐬬𐬊𐬵𐬎), both also meaning lit. 'good'.

=== In Akkadian ===
Wasusarmas is referred to in Neo-Assyrian Akkadian sources as ᵐWassurme or ᵐUassurme (𒁹𒌑𒊍𒋩𒈨).

== Life ==
Wasusarmas was the son of the previous king of Tabal, Tuwattis II. Both Wasusarmas and Tuwattis II may have been part of a dynasty which had ruled Tabal for much of the 1st millennuum century BC, with an earlier king, Tuwattis I, having ruled Tabal in the late 9th century BC, and who might have been an ancestor of Tuwattis II and Wasusarmas.

=== Subjection to the Neo-Assyrian Empire ===
By c. 738 BC, the Tabalian region, including Tabal proper under the reign of Tuwattis II, had become a tributary of the Neo-Assyrian king Tiglath-pileser III (r. 745 – 727 BCE), either after his conquest of Bit Agusi over the course of 743 to 740 BC caused the states of the Tabalian region to submit to him, or possibly as a result of a campaign of Tiglath-pileser III there.

=== Reign ===
Wasusarmas had styled himself using the prestigious titles of "Great King" (Hieroglyphic Luwian: 𔐒, romanized: uras ḫantawattis) and "Hero" (Hieroglyphic Luwian: 𔐕, romanized: ḫastallis). Along with the revival of this title by the possibly contemporary king Ḫartapus who ruled a state further to the west, this was the first time that a Luwian ruler had adopted these titles after the end of their use by the rulers of Karkamiš in the 10th century BC, thus making Wasusarmas the first king in Central Anatolia to have used them after the fall of the Hittite Empire.

Wasusarmas's Topada inscription also arranged the hieroglyphic signs in which it was written into a royal aedicula, which was the first use of this practice since the Late Bronze Age.

Thus, like the king Ḫartapus who ruled a kingdom further west to the Tabalian region, Wasusarmas also used traditional Hittite name and titles, showing that, despite Tabal and the kingdom of Ḫartapus being located in the western peripheries of the post-Hittite world, they were still fully culturally part of the heritage of the Hittite Empire.

==== Expansionism ====
During the century which followed the first attestation of the kingdom of Tabal in 837 BC, it had grown from a small city-state into the largest and strongest of the states of the Tabalian region through aggressive expansionism.

The location of Wasusarmas's inscriptions, especially the ones located at Suvasa, Topada and Göstesin, suggest that Tabal was consolidating its power in northwestern Cappadocia from a base located either in the north-east of the region around the cities corresponding to present-day Kululi and Sultanhan, or in the region to the north of the Halys river.

The kings Warpalawas II of Tuwana and Kiyakiyas of Šinuḫtu might also have been vassals of Wasusarmas.

===== War against Phrygia =====
Wasusarmas's continuation of these expansionist ventures brought him into a four year-long conflict with a coalition of eight enemy rulers led by the king of Phrygia that was itself attempting to encroach on the Tabalian region.

Wasusarmas claimed to have defeated this rival coalition with the help of Warpalawas II of Tuwana, Kiyakiyas of Šinuḫtu, and the otherwise unknown king Ruwandas who might possibly have been identical with the king Ruwas who was a vassal of Tuwattis II. These conflict of Wasusarmas against Phrygia and the conflict opposing the contemporary king Ḫartapus might have been different conflicts within the same war opposing an eastern Neo-Hittite coalition to a western Phrygian coalition.

This Tabalian coalition successfully crossed the Halys river and invaded Phrygia, where it burnt the Phrygian capital of Gordion and deported most of its civilian population to the Tabalian region. Later, while Wasusarmas was campaigning elsewhere, Phrygia counter-attacked the Tabalian region with the help of the Phrygians who had previously been deported there after the attack on Gordion. Wasusarmas claimed in his inscription at Topada that this Phrygian attack was deflected due to divine intervention, resulting in a victory for the Tabalian coalition.

This victory allowed Wasusarmas to expand his borders to the west of the Nevşehir region as part of a project of his to turn Tabal into a significant power in Central Anatolia, thus turning Wasusarmas into the most prominent king of the Tabalian region, after which he appears to have regarded himself as its local hegemon.

==== Deposition ====
Despite being Neo-Assyrian tributary, Wasusarmas continued using the titles of "Great King" and "Hero," and he started taking hostages as slaves and collecting tribute from his enemies, leading to Tiglath-pileser III accusing him of acting as his equal and of imitating the Neo-Assyrian Empire. After he withheld his tribute to Tiglath-pileser III and failed to respond to his overlord's summons, some time between c. 732 to c. 739 BC the Neo-Assyrian king finally decided to put an end to the ambitions of Wasusarmas by sending a eunuch to depose him and replace him as king of Tabal with an individual named Ḫullî.

Although Neo-Assyrian sources referred to Ḫullî with descriptor "son of a nobody" usually denoting commoners, his identity is still uncertain, and he could possibly have been identical with a certain Ḫulis who was the nephew of the king Ruwas who was a vassal of Wasusarmas's father Tuwattis II.

Due to internal Tabalian disunity and fear of Neo-Assyrian retaliation, other Tabalian kings made no attempt to help Wasusarmas, and his deposition of Wasusarmas resulted in a power vacuum in the Tabalian region, while no subsequent ruler from the Tabalian region claimed the title of "Great King" again after him.

== Inscriptions ==
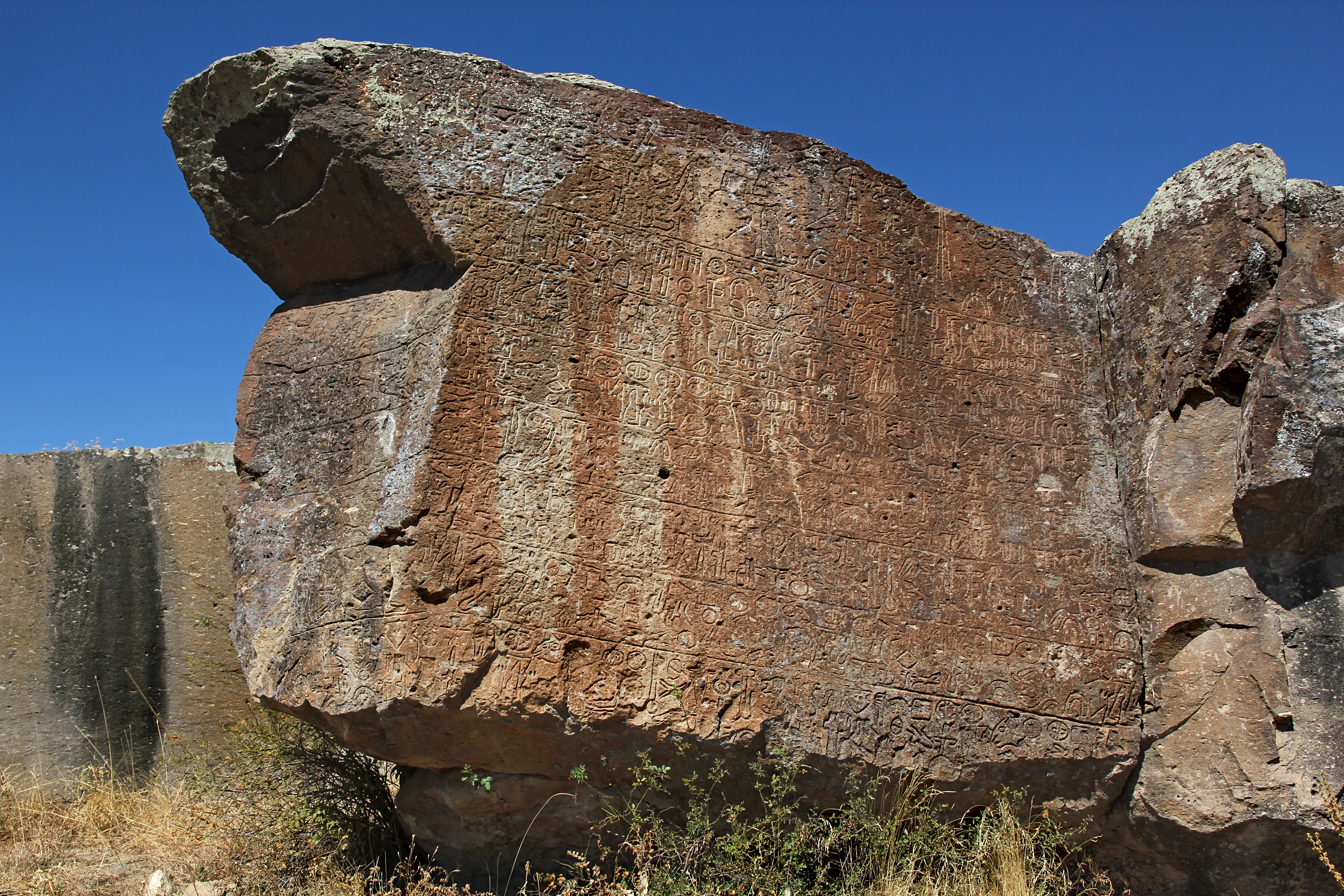
Inscription of Wasusarmas

One inscription of Wasusarmas is known from the site of Topada. This inscription makes use of a very original form of archaising or uncommon Anatolian hieroglyphic signs, as well as of a royal cartouche topped by a winged disc meant to create a connection with the Hittite imperial family, which is a feature it shares with the inscriptions of the king Ḫartapus. The Topada inscription commemorates a war waged by Wasusarmas against a coalition led by the king of Phrygia, and it names Tuwattis II as Wasusarmas's father.

The Topada inscription of Wasusarmas might contain the only reference to the name of Phrygia outside of Graeco-Roman sources. This name, rendered in the inscription as Prizunda (Hieroglyphic Luwian: 𔕸𔖱𔗥𔐭𔔂), that is a contracted form of Prizuwanda, itself formed from the term Priz-, which was a cognate of the Ancient Greek stem Phrug-, as found in the ethnonym Phrugia (Φρυγία), of which the Macedonian variant was Brig-, as found in the ethnonym Briges (Βρίγες).

Three inscriptions by servants of Wasusarmas are also attested from the sites of Sultanhan, Kayseri and Suvasa.

== Sources ==
- Adiego, Ignasi-Xavier [in Catalan] (2019). "The Survival of the God Name Šarruma in Cilician Names in the Greek Sources". Altorientalische Forschungen [Ancient Near Eastern Research]. 46 (2). Walter de Gruyter: 147–160. doi:10.1515/aofo-2019-0010.
- Aro, S. (2013). "Tabal". In Streck, Michael P. [in German]; Frantz-Szabó, Gabriella; Krebernik, Manfred [in German]; Bonacossi, D. Morandi; Postgate, J. N.; Seidl, Ursula [in German]; Stol, M.; Wilhelm, Gernot [in German] (eds.). Reallexikon der Assyriologie und Vorderasiatischen Archäologie [Encyclopaedia of Ancient Near Eastern Studies] (in German). Vol. 13. Berlin, Germany; New York City, United States: Walter de Gruyter. pp. 388–391. ISBN 978-3-110-30715-3.
- Aro, S. (2014). "Uassurme". In Streck, Michael P. [in German]; Frantz-Szabó, Gabriella; Krebernik, Manfred [in German]; Bonacossi, D. Morandi; Postgate, J. N.; Seidl, Ursula [in German]; Stol, M.; Wilhelm, Gernot [in German] (eds.). Reallexikon der Assyriologie und Vorderasiatischen Archäologie [Encyclopaedia of Ancient Near Eastern Studies] (in German). Vol. 14. Berlin, Germany; New York City, United States: Walter de Gruyter. p. 257. ISBN 978-3-110-41761-6.
- Bryce, Trevor (2009). The Routledge Handbook of the Peoples and Places of Ancient Western Asia: From the Early Bronze Age to the Fall of the Persian Empire. London, United Kingdom: Routledge. ISBN 978-0-415-39485-7.
- Bryce, Trevor (2012). The World of The Neo-Hittite Kingdoms: A Political and Military History. Oxford, United Kingdom: Oxford University Press. ISBN 978-0-199-21872-1.
- D'Alfonso, Lorenzo (2012). "Tabal, an 'out-group' definition in the first Millennium BCE". In Lanfranchi, Giovanni B.; Bonacossi, Daniele Morandi; Pappi, Cinzia; Ponchia, Simonetta [in German] (eds.). Leggo! Studies Presented to Frederick Mario Fales on the Occasion of His 65ᵗʰ Birthday. Wiesbaden, Germany: Harrassowitz Verlag. pp. 173–194. ISBN 978-3-447-06659-4.
- D'Alfonso, Lorenzo (2019). "War in Anatolia in the post-Hittite period: the Anatolian Hieroglyphic inscription of TOPADA revised". Journal of Cuneiform Studies. 71. University of Chicago Press for the American Schools of Oriental Research: 133–152. doi:10.1086/703857.
- D'Alfonso, Lorenzo; Pedrinazzi, Matteo (2021). "Forgetting an Empire, Creating a New Order: Trajectories of Rock-cut Monuments from Hittite into Post-Hittite Anatolia, and the Afterlife of the "Throne" of Kızıldağ". In Ben-Dov, Jonathan; Rojas, Felipe (eds.). Afterlives of Ancient Rock-cut Monuments in the Near East: Carvings in and out of Time. Culture and History of the Ancient Near East. Vol. 123. Leiden, Netherlands: BRILL. pp. 114–160. ISBN 978-9-004-46208-3.
- Hawkins, John David [in German] (2000b). Inscriptions of the Iron Age, Part 2: Text: Amuq, Aleppo, Hama, Tabal, Assur Letters, Miscellaneous, Seals, Indices. Corpus of Hieroglyphic Luwian Inscriptions. Vol. 1. Berlin, Germany; New York City, United States: Walter de Gruyter. ISBN 978-3-110-10864-4.
- Hawkins, John David [in German] (2000c). Inscriptions of the Iron Age, Part 3: Plates. Corpus of Hieroglyphic Luwian Inscriptions. Vol. 1. Berlin, Germany; New York City, United States: Walter de Gruyter. ISBN 978-3-110-10864-4.
- Melville, Sarah C. (2010). "Kings of Tabal: Politics; Competition, and Conflict in a Contested Periphery". In Richardson, Seth (ed.). Rebellions and Peripheries in the Cuneiform World. New Haven, United States: American Oriental Society. ISBN 978-0-940-49023-9.
- Simon, Zsolt (2013). "Überlegungen zu Masaurhisas, einem König aus Tabal, und der Herrscherliste von Tuwana" [Reflections on Masaurhisas, a king from Tabal, and the king-list of Tuwana]. Anatolica. 39: 277–296. doi:10.2143/ANA.39.0.2990791.
- Simon, Zsolt (2017). "The Northern Border of Tabal". L'hittitologie aujourd'hui: Études sur l'Anatolie hittite et néo-hittite à l'occasion du centenaire de la naissance d'Emmanuel Laroche [Hittitology today: Studies on Hittite and Neo-Hittite Anatolia in Honor of Emmanuel Laroche's 100th Birthday]. Institut français d'études anatoliennes. pp. 201–211. ISBN 978-2-362-45083-9.
- Simon, Zsolt (2018). "Sapaziti, Sapalulme und die Suppiluliumas von W/Pal(a)stin(a/i)" [Sapaziti, Sapalulme and the Suppiluliumas of W/Pal(a)stin(a/i)]. Altorientalische Forschungen [Ancient Near Eastern Research]. 45 (1). Walter de Gruyter: 122–132. doi:10.1515/aofo-2018-0011.
- Simon, Zsolt (2020). "On some Central Anatolian Neo-Hittite ruler names with Šarruma". Nouvelles Assyriologiques Brèves et Utilitaires [Brief and Useful Assyriological News]. 92 (3): 192–195 – via Academia.
- Weeden, Mark (2010). "Tuwati and Wasusarma: Imitating the Behaviour of Assyria". Iraq. 72. British Institute for the Study of Iraq: 39–61. doi:10.1017/S0021088900000589.
- Weeden, Mark (2017). "Tabal and the Limits of Assyrian Imperialism". In Heffron, Yağmur; Stone, Adam; Worthington, Martin (eds.). At the Dawn of History: Ancient Near Eastern Studies in Honour of J. N. Postgate. Vol. 2. Winona, United States: Eisenbrauns. pp. 721–736. ISBN 978-1-57506-471-0.
- Weeden, Mark (2023). "The Iron Age States of Central Anatolia and Northern Syria". In Radner, Karen; Moeller, Nadine; Potts, Daniel T. (eds.). The Age of Assyria. The Oxford History of the Ancient Near East. Vol. 4. New York City, United States: Oxford University Press. pp. 912–1026. ISBN 978-0-190-68763-2.
- Yakubovich, Ilya (2002). Shevoroshkin, Vitaly; Sidwell, Paul (eds.). Nugae Luvicae. Canberra, Australia: Association for the History of Language. pp. 189–209. ISBN 978-0-957-72514-0.

Wasusarmas Tuwattis I's dynasty (?)
Regnal titles
Preceded by Tuwattis II	Great King of Tabal c. 740-c. 730 BC	Succeeded by Ḫullî
