= Divinity =

Related to, devoted to, or proceeding from a deity

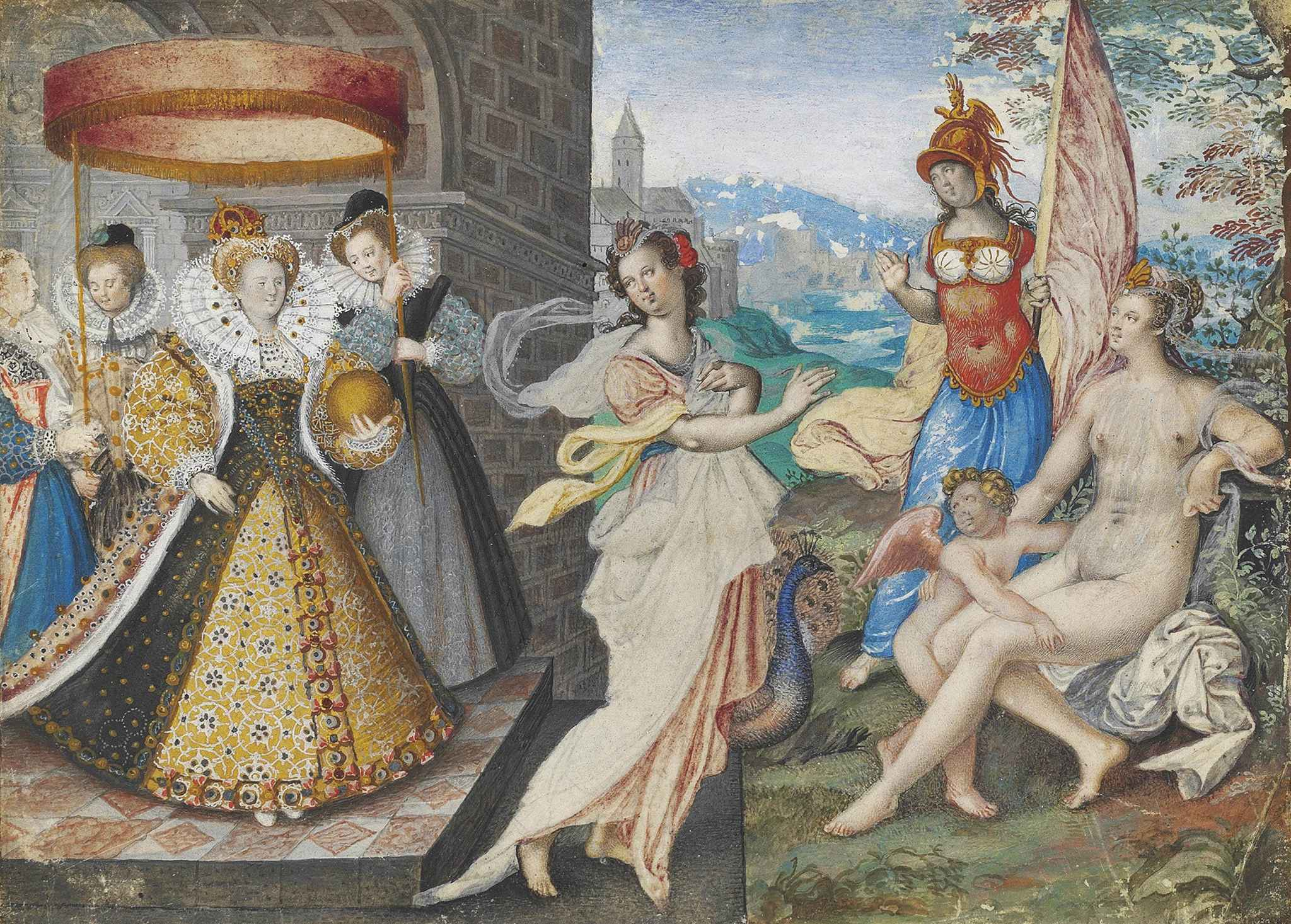
Elizabeth I and the Three Goddesses (Juno, Minerva, and Venus), by Isaac Oliver, c. 1558

Divinity (from Latin divinitas) refers to the quality, presence, or nature of that which is divine—a term that, before the rise of monotheism, evoked a broad and dynamic field of sacred power. In the ancient world, divinity was not limited to a single deity or abstract ideal but was recognized in multiple forms: as a radiant attribute possessed by gods, as a vital force cushioning nature, and even as a quality glimpsed in extraordinary humans, laws, or acts. The Latin divinitas and its Greek counterparts (theiotēs, theion) conveyed something both immanent and awe-inspiring: a presence that could be felt in thunder, justice, ecstasy, fate, or beauty.

Among the Greeks and Romans, divinity was not confined to a rigid theological system. Gods, heroes, and even emperors might be described as partaking in divinity, just as natural forces or virtue could be seen as expressions of divine essence. Philosophers such as Plato and the Stoics used the term to refer to the soul of the cosmos or the rational order of the universe, while ritual and myth depicted the divine in vivid ways. To call something divine was not always to worship it as a god, but to acknowledge its participation in a higher, sacred order.

Early Christianity inherited this language but dramatically reshaped it. With the rise of theological monotheism, divinity came increasingly to denote the singular and absolute nature of God. The Christianization of the term narrowed its field: what had once described a quality diffused across nature, fate, and multiple gods was now claimed exclusively for the creator God and, later, extended to Christ and the Holy Spirit through doctrines of the Trinity. Over time, this led to a sharper boundary between the divine and the human, the sacred and the profane.

In contemporary usage, divinity most commonly refers either to a deity (especially in monotheistic traditions) or to a transcendent power associated with sacredness, inspiration, or spiritual authority. The term may describe the essential nature of God, as well as religious experiences, beings, or principles considered beyond ordinary human life. Outside formal religion, divinity is sometimes used in philosophical or metaphorical contexts, where it retains associations with elevated or ultimate significance.

== Etymology and conceptual range ==
The English word divinity derives from the Latin term divinitas, which itself stems from divinus, meaning "of a god" or "divine". The Latin root echoes similar concepts in Greek, notably theiotēs (θειότης) and theion (τὸ θεῖον), both of which convey a sense of sacred power, majesty, or godlike essence.

In pre-Christian Greco-Roman religion, divinity was widely understood as a diffuse and dynamic force rather than a fixed identity. The divine could manifest through natural phenomena—such as thunder, sunlight, or fertility—or through human actions exemplifying justice, courage, or beauty. The word divinitas might be used of a god, a spirit, a concept like fate, or even an Emperor, reflecting a worldview in which divine qualities permeated multiple layers of existence.

This conceptual range extended into early philosophical usage. Plato described theion in relation to the Form of the Good, associating it with the source of truth and intelligibility. For the Stoics, the divine was understood as a rational and animating principle that pervaded the cosmos, often identified with logos or nature itself. In such traditions, divinity was not only transcendent but also deeply immanent, present in the order and structure of the world.

== In classical antiquity ==
In classical antiquity, the divine was not conceived as wholly separate from the world but was instead embedded within it. Gods, heroes, natural forces, abstract concepts, and even exemplary humans could all be considered partakers in or bearers of divinity. The term divinitas in Latin and its Greek equivalents were applied not only to deities like Jupiter or Athena, but also to phenomena such as fate (moira) or justice (dike).

Public religion in both Ancient Greece and Ancient Rome involved a complex interplay between civic life and sacred presence. Gods were not remote; they were part of the polis, honored in temples, festivals, and rituals that affirmed their power and proximity. Emperors in Rome, for instance, could be described as having numen or even divinitas, indicating a recognized form of divine power or sanction rather than full deification.

Divinity also permeated the natural world. Rivers, mountains, stars, and weather were thought to express divine will or presence. This fluid understanding allowed for multiple overlapping expressions of the divine across the physical and social world. In this context, sacrifice, divination, and augury were not merely symbolic acts but means of communication with divine forces that shaped the rhythms of life.

Mystery cults and regional traditions added further dimensions to ancient understandings of divinity. Figures such as Dionysus or Isis embodied divine realities experienced through ritual initiation, ecstasy, and spiritual transformation. These cults often emphasized personal encounters with the divine, in contrast to the more public and civic nature of traditional state religion.

In addition to gods and natural forces, the Greeks also recognized a class of intermediate beings known as daimones (δαίμονες), whose roles ranged from protective spirits to agents of fate. Originally understood as morally neutral or even benevolent, a daimōn could denote a divine presence or inspiration not fully personified as a god. Philosophers such as Socrates described their personal daimōnion as a kind of guiding voice or spiritual influence. As E. R. Dodds noted, the daimōn represented an "impersonal agency" often closer to fate or inward inspiration than to anthropomorphic deity. Only later, under Christian influence, did daimōn become associated with malevolent demons—a reinterpretation that obscured its original connection to divinity.

== Philosophical and theological reflections ==
Ancient philosophy developed increasingly abstract conceptions of divinity, seeking to understand the nature of the divine beyond anthropomorphic gods. For Plato, the divine was not confined to the traditional pantheon but was associated with the eternal and unchanging Form of the Good—the highest reality and source of truth, intelligibility, and order. The divine, in this framework, was radically transcendent but also the ultimate cause and goal of all existence.

Later Middle Platonism and Neoplatonism extended this abstraction. In the writings of Plotinus, the divine was identified with the ineffable One, from which all reality emanates in hierarchical stages. Divinity, in this view, was not a person or force but the source of being itself. Below the One were successive layers of reality: the Nous, the World Soul, and the material world. Each stage retained something of the divine, though to lesser degrees.

The Stoics offered a contrasting, more immanent view. For them, the divine was not separate from nature but identical with it—expressed as logos, the rational principle that ordered the cosmos. Every part of the universe, including the human soul, participated in this divine reason. Stoic ethics were grounded in living according to this divine nature, aligning the individual will with the cosmic order.

These philosophical developments interacted with evolving religious traditions. In Hellenistic religion, philosophical conceptions of the divine coexisted with traditional cultic practices and new forms of personal piety. Ideas about divine immanence, transcendence, and hierarchical being shaped how mystery religions, astrology, and theurgy were interpreted and practiced.

In Gnosticism, emerging in the same intellectual milieu as Middle Platonism and Neoplatonism, a radical reinterpretation of divinity developed. In many Gnostic systems, true divinity was wholly transcendent and unknowable—often called the Pleroma or Invisible Spirit—while the visible world was the flawed creation of a lesser being, the Demiurge, ignorant of the higher realms. This cosmological dualism recast divine hierarchy not as a continuum of emanation but as a rupture between divine fullness and cosmic error. Gnostic texts such as the Secret Book of John describe the soul's entrapment in materiality and its path of ascent through layers of hostile archons, aided by inner revelation (gnosis) and the remembrance of its divine spark. In this view, divinity was present as a spark within the human being, a fragment of the higher world seeking return.

The elasticity of the concept also allowed for overlap between divine beings and metaphysical principles. Theurgy, as practiced by Neoplatonists like Iamblichus, emphasized ritual engagement with divine intelligences, asserting that divine powers could be invoked and experienced through specific acts. Gnostic traditions likewise incorporated theurgical elements—especially in their use of invocations, names of power, and visionary ascent texts—to transcend the material realm and rejoin the divine source. In such contexts, ritual was not merely symbolic but transformative. Through prescribed invocations, visualizations, and gestures, practitioners sought a form of ritual identification with divine powers, temporarily embodying aspects of the divine as a means of ascent or union.

By late antiquity, such reflections had laid the groundwork for later Christian theology, Islamic philosophy, and Jewish mysticism, all of which engaged with and reinterpreted these classical philosophical insights into the nature of the divine.

== Second Temple Judaism and early Christianity ==
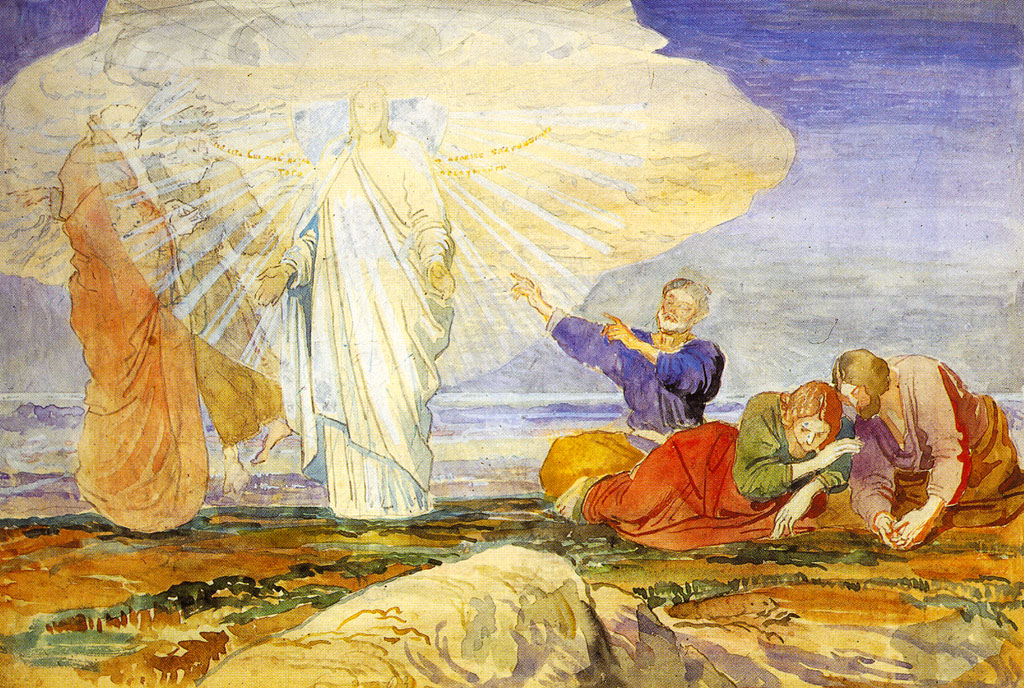
Transfiguration by Alexandr Ivanov, 1824

The Christian reconfiguration of divinity cannot be understood apart from the theological developments of Second Temple Judaism. During this period, Jewish thought increasingly emphasized the singular and transcendent nature of God, in contrast to the polytheism of surrounding cultures. Although the Hebrew Bible includes references to divine beings—such as angels, the Elohim, and the heavenly hosts—Jewish philosophy came to insist that only the God of Israel was truly divine.

At the same time, certain Jewish texts introduced intermediary figures such as Wisdom (חָכְמָה, Ḥokhmāh), the Logos, and the Son of Man—portrayed in works like 1 Enoch, the Book of Daniel, and the Wisdom of Solomon. These figures served as vehicles for divine action and presence without threatening strict monotheism. This layered view of divinity helped lay the groundwork for early Christian theology.

The rise of Christianity introduced a profound transformation in the concept of divinity. Drawing on both Second Temple Judaism and Greco-Roman philosophy, early Christian thinkers redefined the divine not as a plural or diffused power but as the singular and transcendent being of God. This theological shift placed greater emphasis on divine unity, omnipotence, and moral perfection.

Central to this transformation was the assertion of the divinity of Jesus. Early Christians believed that Jesus, though fully human, also shared in the divine nature. This radical claim provoked intense theological debate, especially over how divinity could be reconciled with humanity. In the fourth century, the Council of Nicaea (325 CE) affirmed that Christ was homoousios ("of the same substance") with the Father, a term drawn from Greek metaphysics to assert full equality within the Trinity.

The doctrine of the Trinity—Father, Son, and Holy Spirit as three persons sharing one divine essence—emerged as a core feature of Christian theology, marking a significant departure from earlier polytheistic and philosophical models. Christian thinkers such as Athanasius, Gregory of Nyssa, and Augustine of Hippo worked to articulate a divine unity that preserved distinct personal identities without division.

In this context, divinity came to denote not a quality diffused through nature or cosmos but the essential being of the Creator. The divine was no longer immanent in rivers, stars, or fate, but radically transcendent, revealed through revelation, incarnation, and sacrament. At the same time, mystical theology and sacramental theology preserved a sense of divine presence operating within the world, particularly through the Eucharist and the Holy Spirit.

The Christianization of the concept also reshaped language. The Greek term theiotēs—used in earlier texts for divine quality—was absorbed into Christian scripture and doctrine, as in Romans 1:20, where it refers to God's "eternal power and divinity." The Latin divinitas likewise narrowed in scope, now primarily describing the being of God and, derivatively, that of Christ and the Spirit.

In sum, early Christianity both inherited and redefined classical ideas of divinity, recasting them within a monotheistic and doctrinal framework that would shape theological discourse for centuries.

== Mystical and medieval views ==
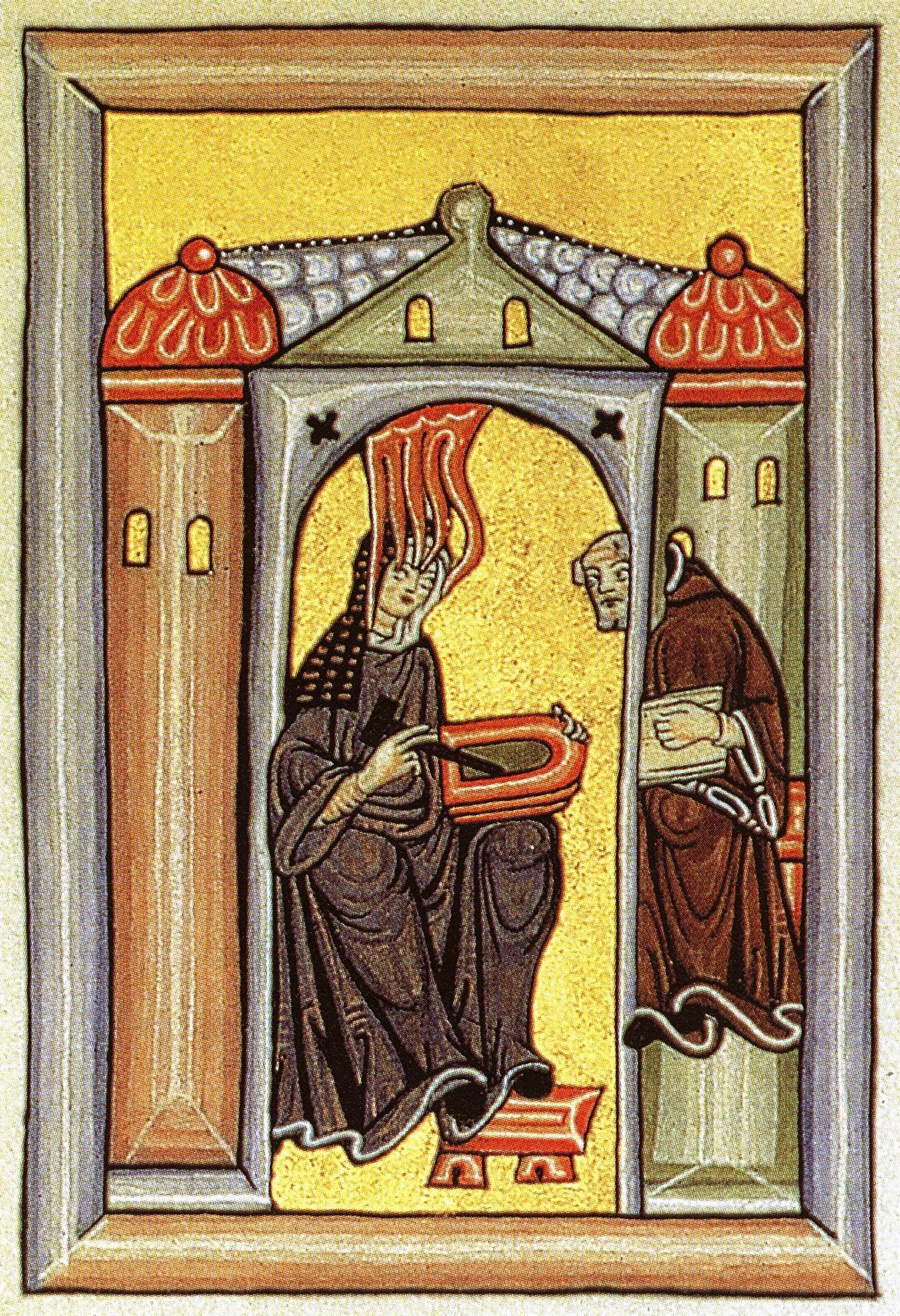
Hildegard von Bingen receives a divine inspiration and passes it on to her scribe

In both Christian and non-Christian traditions, divinity has often been understood not only as a theological proposition but as a reality encountered through mysticism, vision, or ecstatic experience. These encounters are frequently described as praeternatural—beyond ordinary nature but not necessarily supernatural in a transcendent or theistic sense.

In Christian mysticism, figures such as Hildegard of Bingen, Mechthild of Magdeburg, Meister Eckhart, and Julian of Norwich described divine presence in terms that transcend rational theology: as an ineffable union, a luminous darkness, a radiant harmony, or what Eckhart called the Ground of the Soul—a silent depth where divinity and the self are one. Hildegard articulated her visionary theology through music and illuminations, describing the divine as "Living Light" and the world as shot through with divine vitality.

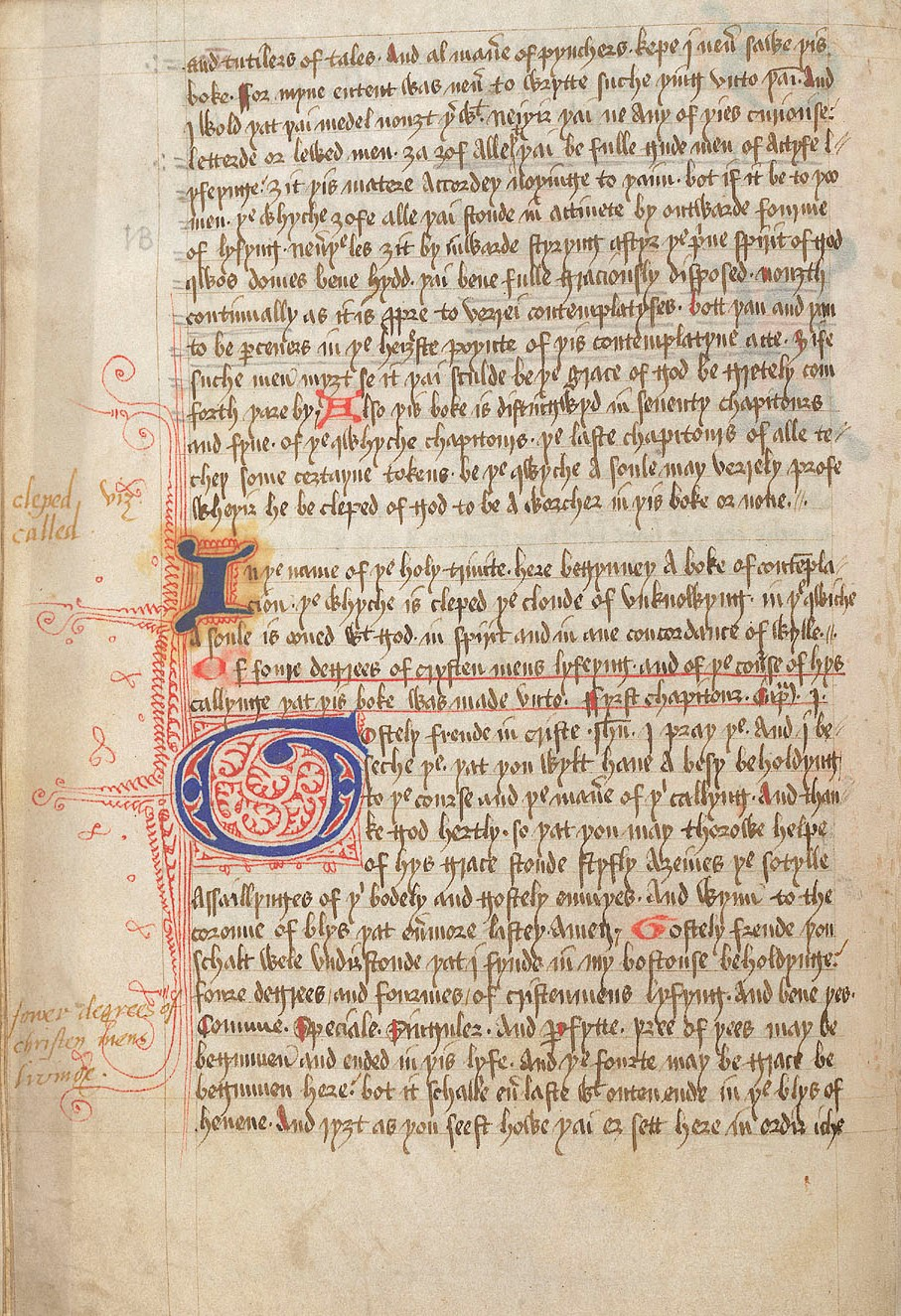
The first page of Cloud of Unknowing in the 15th century manuscript Harley MS 2373

Another voice was that of the Book of the 24 Philosophers, a 12th-century anonymous text offering cryptic, metaphysical definitions of divinity such as "God is an infinite sphere whose center is everywhere and circumference nowhere." These definitions were meditated upon throughout the Middle Ages and Renaissance, influencing Hermeticists and Christian humanists alike.

These currents of mystical theology culminate in texts like the 14th-century The Cloud of Unknowing, which urges the contemplative to abandon all concepts and dwell in a "cloud" of forgetting and unknowing, through which love alone may reach God. Such writings reflect a broader medieval tradition of apophatic theology, or the via negativa, where the divine is approached not through assertions but through negation, paradox, and silence.

Meanwhile, more systematic theological reflections were offered by scholastic thinkers such as Thomas Aquinas, who defined God as ipsum esse subsistens—the very act of being itself. For Aquinas, God is both radically transcendent and immanently present, knowable through natural reason yet exceeding all conceptual grasp. Aquinas's synthesis of Aristotelian metaphysics and Christian doctrine represented a high point of medieval intellectual theology.

Umberto Eco observed that medieval thought did not regard God as merely the conclusion of a logical system, but as the principle of harmony, proportion, and illumination that permeated all levels of reality—from grammar and rhetoric to cosmology. For medieval thinkers, the divine was not just a theological abstraction but the very pattern by which the world was ordered and intelligible.

== Modern and secular use ==
In modern philosophy and secular discourse, the concept of divinity has been reinterpreted, challenged, and, in some contexts, retained in metaphorical or symbolic form. Age of Enlightenment critiques of theism and revelation prompted many thinkers to redefine or discard traditional notions of divine agency. At the same time, the idea of “the divine” persisted as a way to speak about ultimate concerns, transcendence, or the horizon of meaning.

Some modern philosophers, such as Immanuel Kant, relegated knowledge of the divine to the realm of practical reason, arguing that moral obligation points toward the postulation of God, though God cannot be known through speculative reason. Others, like Friedrich Schleiermacher, emphasized religious feeling as a sense of the infinite, shifting the ground of divinity from doctrine to experience.

In depth psychology, particularly in the work of Carl Gustav Jung, divinity is approached not as an external being but as a central archetype within the collective unconscious. Jung interpreted the divine as a symbol of the Self—the totality of the psyche—which often appears in dreams and visions as luminous, numinous figures. His model emphasized the psychological necessity of religious imagery, arguing that symbolic representations of divinity serve to mediate the integration of unconscious contents into consciousness. This approach reframed traditional theological questions in terms of inner experience and individuation, influencing fields ranging from theology to comparative religion.

In the twentieth century, theologians such as Paul Tillich described God as the "ground of being" rather than a being among others, influencing post-theistic and existential theology. Philosophers such as Charles Taylor and Mark Johnston have explored how secular modernity continues to be shaped by religious categories, even as explicit belief declines. In this view, divinity may refer less to a supernatural entity than to what commands awe, love, or ethical seriousness in a disenchanted world.

In sum, modern and secular philosophies have neither wholly abandoned nor wholly retained ancient conceptions of divinity. Instead, they have recast the divine in terms of value, depth, and existential orientation—often preserving its affective and symbolic power while detaching it from metaphysical or doctrinal claims.

== Contemporary usage ==
In contemporary usage, the term divinity continues to serve multiple roles across religious, philosophical, and cultural contexts. In mainstream Christianity, Islam, and Judaism, divinity is most often associated with the singular, transcendent being of God, understood as omnipotent, omniscient, and morally perfect. In theology, it refers to God's essential nature or substance—especially in discussions of Trinitarianism or divine attributes.

Beyond formal religion, the term is often used more broadly to describe a quality of sacredness, inspiration, or ultimate significance. In many forms of spirituality, particularly within the New Age and ecospirituality movements, divinity may be conceived as immanent in the cosmos, nature, or the self. The phrase "the divine" can refer to a felt presence, a source of inner transformation, or a principle of harmony and connection.

Modern pagan and Wiccan views of divinity are often expressed through duotheism, a theological structure that emphasizes a divine feminine (the Goddess) and a divine masculine (the Horned God), representing complementary cosmic forces. Scholars such as Ronald Hutton and Margot Adler have noted that Wiccan theology often blends polytheism, pantheism, and animism, emphasizing direct religious experience and reverence for Nature.

In academic contexts, divinity remains a key term in disciplines such as philosophy of religion, comparative religion, and theological studies. It is frequently examined in light of global religious diversity, cross-cultural mysticism, and changing understandings of transcendence. Universities and seminaries often use the term in institutional titles (e.g., "School of Divinity") to denote programs of study in theology, ministry, or sacred texts.

Popular usage of "divine" or "divinity" also extends into literature, art, and everyday speech, where it can signal aesthetic admiration, moral approval, or emotional intensity. Though sometimes metaphorical, such uses often retain a sense of elevated or awe-inspiring significance.

== Comparative and cross-cultural perspectives ==
Across world religions, the concept of divinity encompasses a wide range of meanings, from personal gods to impersonal forces, from transcendent creators to immanent presences. In many traditions outside the Abrahamic lineage, divinity is not confined to a singular, all-powerful being but is encountered as multiple, interrelated aspects of reality.

In Hinduism, divinity can be personal, as in the worship of Vishnu or Shiva, or impersonal, as in the identification of the divine with Brahman, the ultimate, formless ground of being. Tantric traditions emphasize ritual embodiment and visualization as means of accessing divine power, often conceived in nondual terms.

In Buddhism, although the tradition is non-theistic in its mainstream forms, certain schools—particularly in Vajrayana and East Asian traditions—describe states of enlightenment using language of divine radiance, luminosity, or purity. The Dharmakaya or "truth body" of a buddha is sometimes compared to an all-pervasive divine principle, although without implying a creator god.

In Sufism, the mystical expression of Islam, divinity is often approached through the language of love, beauty, and yearning. The divine names and attributes are experienced as veils of the One, and the spiritual path involves remembrance (dhikr) and annihilation of the self (fana) in the divine.

Many indigenous religions and animist traditions understand divinity as an immanent presence within the natural world—rivers, trees, animals, ancestors—each bearing a spark of sacred power. Rather than separating the divine from the mundane, such traditions often treat the cosmos itself as alive and communicative.

Although theologies differ widely, a common thread across many traditions is the experience of the divine as something that both transcends and pervades reality, often described in symbolic or paradoxical language. Nondualism—the view that divinity and reality are ultimately not-two—is a recurring theme in both Eastern and Western mysticism, offering a shared framework for interpreting the sacred across cultural boundaries.

== See also ==
- Augoeides – Hermetic starfire body
- Classical education
- Divine Comedy – Italian narrative poem by Dante Alighieri
- Divine countenance – Face of God
- Divine grace – Theological term
- Divine illumination – Human thought aided by divine grace
- Divine intervention – God-like deity aiding from above
- Divine judgment – Judgment of supreme beings within a religion
- Divine light – Aspect of divine presence
- Divine madness – Behavior linked to spiritual pursuits
- Divine mercy – Attribute of God
- Divine Mercy (Catholic devotion) – Catholic devotion
- Divine presence – Concept in religion, spirituality, and theology
- Divine proportion – Number, approximately 1.618
- Divine providence – God's intervention in the universe
- Divine retribution – Supernatural punishment by a deity
- Divine right of kings – Religious doctrine on the authority of monarchs
- Divine simplicity – View of God without parts or features
- Divine spark – Theological concept about the portion of God that resides within each human being
- Divine vision – Something seen in a dream, trance, or religious ecstasy
- Divinization – Transforming effect of divine grace
- Ground – Primordial state in Tibetan Buddhism
- Monas Hieroglyphica – 1564 book by John Dee about an esoteric symbol
- Theophany – Appearance of a deity in an observable way
