= Acıgöl District =

District of Nevşehir Province, Turkey

- District
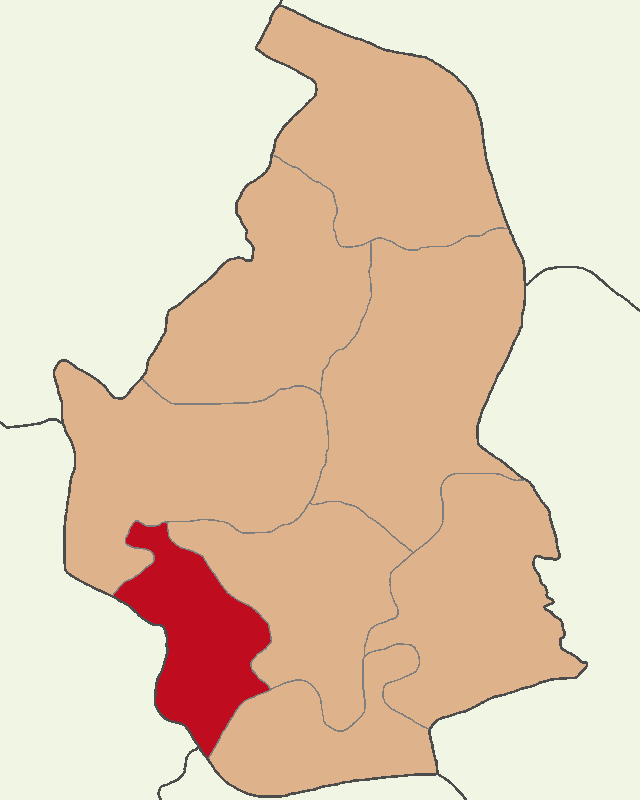
- Map showing Acıgöl District in Nevşehir Province

- Location in Turkey Acıgöl District (Turkey Central Anatolia)
- Coordinates: 38°33′N 34°31′E
- Country: Turkey
- Province: Nevşehir
- Seat: Acıgöl

Government
  - Kaymakam: Emine Karataş Yıldız
- Area: 456 km^{2} (176 sq mi)
- Population (2022): 19,005
  - Density: 42/km^{2} (110/sq mi)
- Time zone: UTC+3 (TRT)
- Website: www.acigol.gov.tr

Acıgöl District is a district of the Nevşehir Province of Turkey. Its seat is the town of Acıgöl. Its area is 456 km^{2}, and its population is 19,005 (2022).

== Composition ==
There are three municipalities in Acıgöl District:

- Acıgöl
- Karapınar
- Tatlarin

There are 10 villages in Acıgöl District:

- Ağıllı
- Bağlıca
- Çullar
- İnallı
- Karacaören
- Kozluca
- Kurugöl
- Tepeköy
- Topaç
- Yuva
