= Tatlarin =

- Municipality
- Location in Turkey Tatlarin (Turkey Central Anatolia)
- Coordinates: 38°38′07″N 34°28′15″E
- Country: Turkey
- Province: Nevşehir
- District: Acıgöl
- Population (2022): 1,976
- Time zone: UTC+3 (TRT)

Tatlarin is a town (belde) in the Acıgöl District, Nevşehir Province, Turkey. Its population is 1,976 (2022).
