= Karapınar, Acıgöl =

Karapınar
- Municipality
- Location in Turkey Karapınar (Turkey Central Anatolia)
- Coordinates: 38°30′52″N 34°32′56″E
- Country: Turkey
- Province: Nevşehir
- District: Acıgöl
- Population (2022): 2,917
- Time zone: UTC+3 (TRT)

Karapınar is a town (belde) in the Acıgöl District, Nevşehir Province, Turkey. Its population is 2,917 (2022).
