= Greco-Roman religion =

Religious traditions of ancient Greece and Rome

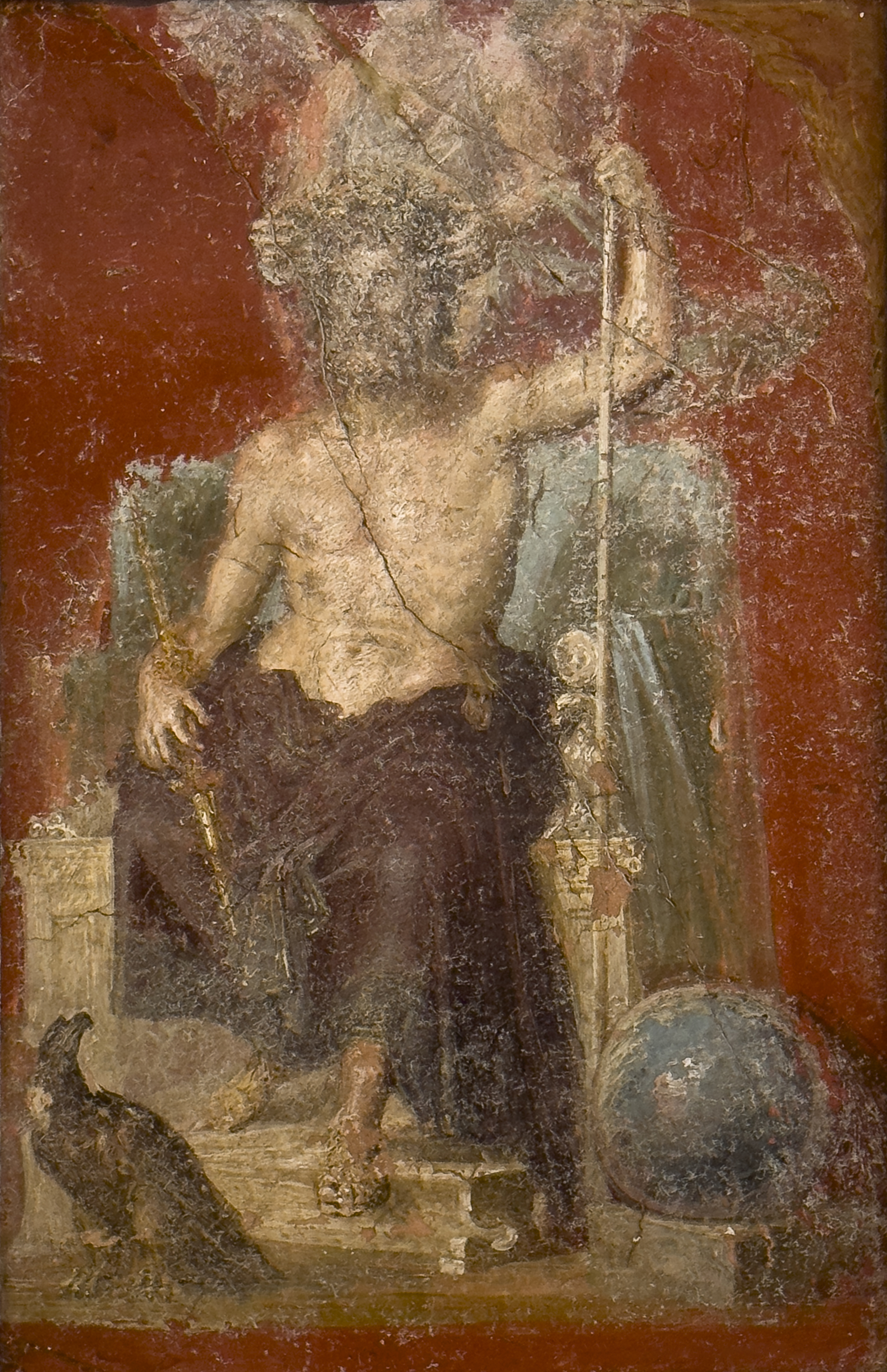
Fresco of enthroned Zeus/Jupiter, king of the gods in Greco-Roman religion. Pompeii, House of the Dioscuri, 62-79 CE.

Greco-Roman religion refers to the religious systems, cults, and theological ideas that characterized the cultures of the ancient Greco-Roman world. The traditions of Greek religion and Roman religion developed independently and became interleaved through cultural exchange, conquest, and philosophical synthesis, especially during the Hellenistic period and the height of the Roman Empire.

In both Greek and Roman contexts, religion was deeply embedded in public life, involving practices such as sacrifice, divination, and temple ritual. Gods and goddesses were venerated as powers active in the cosmos and the city, often associated with natural forces, civic virtues, and mythic narratives. The Greek pantheon and Roman pantheon overlapped significantly, with Roman deities often interpreted through the lens of interpretatio graeca—the identification of Roman gods with their Greek counterparts.

Beyond official state cults, Greco-Roman religion also included local cults, household worship, and the widespread participation in mystery religions such as the Eleusinian Mysteries, the cult of Isis, and Mithraism. Philosophers from Plato to Plotinus engaged with religious themes, elaborating metaphysical interpretations of divinity and introducing magical concepts such as theurgy—rituals designed to unite the soul with the divine.

== History ==
The development of Greco-Roman religion was largely shaped by ongoing cultural interactions, military expansion, and political unification. The Romans not only inherited but also expanded on the religious syncretism begun during the Hellenistic period.

== Beliefs ==
Although belief isnt necessarily the most imortant ascept wthin the Greco-Roman world, scholar Bart Erhman identifies some common characterisitcs

- a. Polytheistic: worshiping many gods
- b. Concerned with the present life instead of the afterlife
- c. Focused on cultic acts of worship rather than doctrines (what to believe) or ethics (how to behave)
- d. Closely connected with the political state
- e. Tolerant of other religions and nonexclusivistic (i.e., none of them insisted that it was right and that all others were wrong)

== Core practices and rituals ==
Religious practices within Greco-Roman religion included those within both the public and private spheres.

In the private sphere, or in households, deities associated with various places or actions were venerated. Alongside their regular daily activities, individuals paid their respects to those deities, or the indigitamenta. Idols and offerings to those idols were often placed on benches made of clay or stone. Additionally, the private use of things such as lead curse bracelets, binding spells or curse tablets, and enchanted threads to attract love or quell hostiles were also common magical practices. Beyond that, religious practice also included "voluntary associations." Membership within these associations was reliant on personal choice rather than birth or geography, allowing individuals to take charge of that aspect of their identity within a broader imperial society.

Within the public sphere, the core practices and rituals were interwoven with civic and political institutions. There existed public priests who acted as a sub–group of the politically elite since they would supervise or be involved in rituals for the city-state. For example, the priests posted calendars which regulated public time on a civic scale. These calendars allowed them to officially set Fasti days and Nefasti days. Fasti dies were days during which markets and public assemblies were allowed. Conversely, during sacred festival Nefasti dies, secular tasks were restricted as those days were to be dedicated to a god. Essentially, the civic priesthoods were a socio political system wherein the wealthy elite class funneled some of their fortune toward financing public cults and temples in exchange for civic honor and power.

Additionally, particular public regulations established certain guidelines such as how biennial fees ought to be paid to the public priestess and when raw meat could be thrown away; these regulations governed cultic associations, or thiasoi. Also, there were laws that mandated rituals for brides and pregnant women during the worship of Artemis. Some purity regulations were also set in place for women who may have gone through childbirth or a miscarriage.

A significant element of public worship was animal sacrifice in temple altars; these sacrifices were meant to both generate fellowship, or koinonia, among worshippers and honor the deity. In fact, animal sacrifice was the primary mechanism of communication with the divine, and it followed a particular program: a "procession, altar [gathering], [presentation of] preparatory offerings, flute accompaniment, [and] the catching of blood." The gods were further honored through libations. A tangible bond and communication was maintained through votive offerings, or anathemata. These gifts were deposited in the sanctuaries and ranged from valuable items such as gold implements and bronze weapons to simple clay models, or simulacra.

In this way, ritual practices were believed to have "learned casuistry," helping practitioners resolve dilemmas. There were implicit meanings as well — such as animal sacrifice which symbolized the gods dining with the rest of humanity.

Communication with the divine was actively sought out. In addition to animal sacrifices and offerings, individuals also turned to prophecy before undertaking any major tasks. Technical prophecy analyzed things like celestial or animal phenomena (such as augury) and omens. Alternatively, mantic prophecy included a human psyche becoming possessed by a divine spirit; an example of this are the oracles delivered at Delphi.

== See also ==
- Gallo-Roman religion
- Paganism

== Bibliography ==
- Beard, Mary; North, John; Price, Simon (1998). Religions of Rome: Volume 1, A History. Cambridge University Press. ISBN 978-1-316-13910-3.
- Shaw, G.; Milbank, J. (2014). Theurgy and the Soul: The Neoplatonism of Iamblichus. Angelico Press. ISBN 978-1-62138-072-6.
- Versnel, H. S. (2011). Coping With the Gods: Wayward Readings in Greek Theology. Brill. ISBN 978-90-04-20490-4.
- Johnson, Luke (2009). Greco-Roman Religion and Christianity. New Haven & London: Yale University Press. ISBN 978-0-300-14208-2.
- Burkert, Walter (1985). Greek Religion. Translated by Raffan, John. Cambridge, Massachusetts: Harvard University Press. ISBN 0-674-36281-0.
- Teixidor, Javier (1977). The Pagan God: Popular Religion in the Greco-Roman Near East. Princeton, New Jersey: Princeton University Press. ISBN 978-0691072203.
- Rives, James (2010-02-10). "Graeco-Roman Religion in the Roman Empire: Old Assumptions and New Approaches". Currents in Biblical Research. 8 (2) – via Sage Journals.
- Kraemer, Ross (2004). Women's Religion in the Greco-Roman World: A Sourcebook. New York, New York: Oxford University Press. ISBN 0-19-514278-0.
- Ehrman, Bart. The New Testament: A Historical Introduction to the Early Christian Writings 6th edition. Oxford: OUP, 2016. ISBN 978-0190203825.
