= Jorrit Kelder =

Dutch archaeologist and historian

- Born: 1980 (age 45–46)

Academic background
- Education: University of Amsterdam (Doctorandus) Vrije Universiteit Amsterdam (PhD)
- Thesis: The Kingdom of Mycenae. A Great Kingdom in the Late Bronze Age Aegean.

Academic work
- Discipline: Archaeology
- Sub-discipline: Bronze Age Aegean and Classical Greek archaeology
- Institutions: Leiden University

Jorrit Kelder (born 1980) is a Dutch archaeologist and ancient historian. He is known especially for his work on Mycenaean political structures, and in particular his argument (first proposed in 2005 and elaborated on in a 2010 monograph) that the Mycenaean world was a single, unified state (rather than a patchwork of culturally similar, yet politically independent palace states, as had hitherto been proposed).

Kelder has worked as a policy officer or adviser for various academic institutions, including the Netherlands Organisation to Scientific Research, the university of Amsterdam, the University of Oxford, and Leiden University. He has held, and continues to hold, various (honorary) affiliated positions. and is currently a postdoctoral researcher in the “From Aleph to Alpha” project, headed by Willemijn Waal. He was a visiting professor in Greek Archaeology at Ghent University in the 2019-2020 academic year, a guest researcher at Leiden University, and an associate member of the sub-faculty of Near and Middle Eastern Studies at the University of Oxford and a member of the common room of Wolfson College, Oxford.

Kelder is a member of the Board of Luwian Studies. Previously, he served as a member of the supervisory board of the Teylers Museum, and as a member of the advisory committee of the Dutch Art and Heritage council, the Mondriaan Fonds. He has been the recipient of various prestigious fellowships, including a fellowship from the Alexander S. Onassis Public Benefit Foundation and a Guest Scholarship at the J. Paul Getty Museum.

Apart from his work on Mycenaean political structures, Kelder has published extensively on the Mycenaean world and its connections to contemporary civilisations, including Egypt and Hittite.
