= Acıgöl =

- Municipality
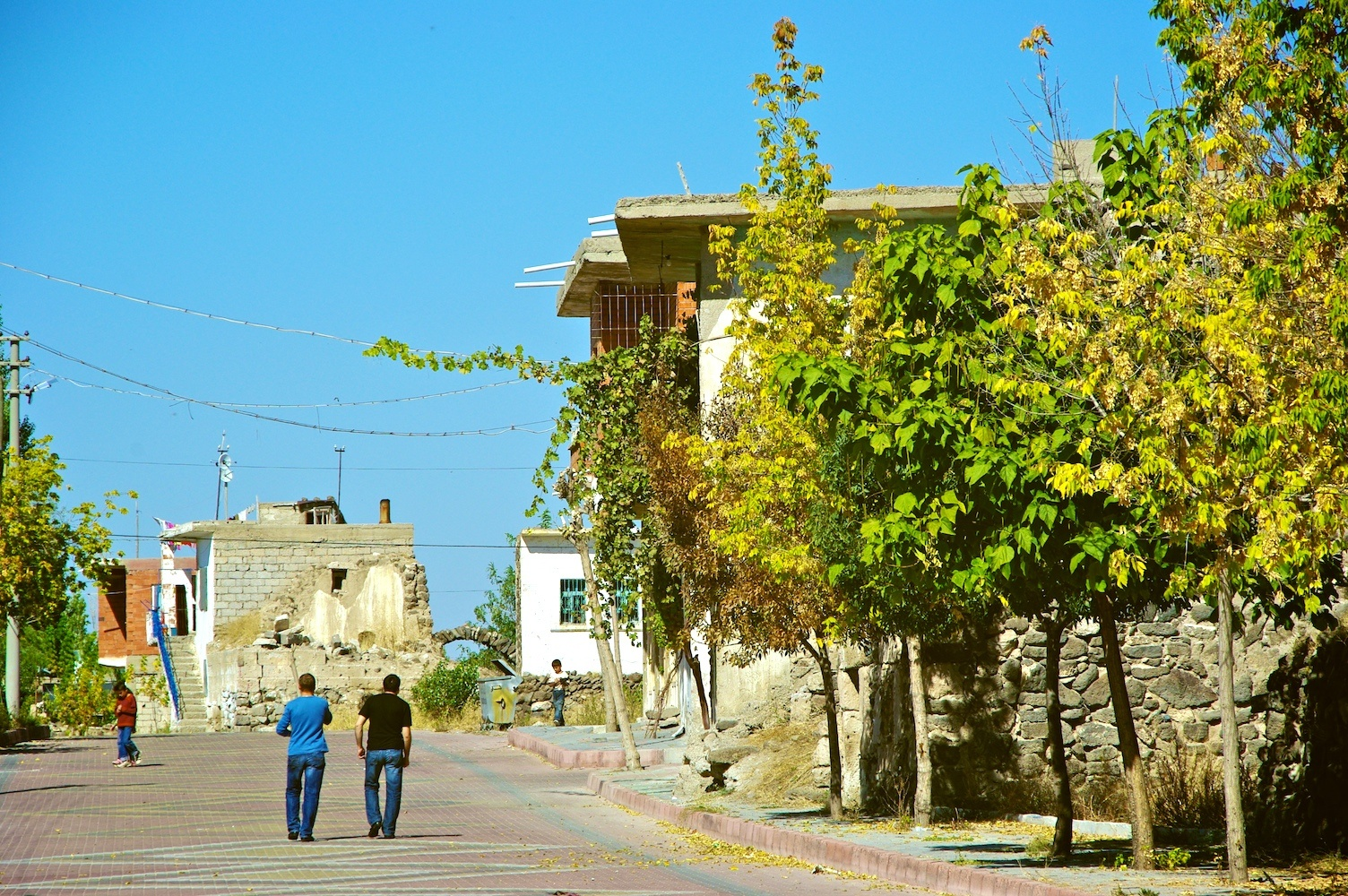

- Location within Turkey Location within Turkey Central Anatolia
- Coordinates: 38°33′N 34°31′E
- Country: Turkey
- Province: Nevşehir
- District: Acıgöl

Government
  - Mayor: Mehmet Eroğlu (MHP)
- Elevation: 1,276 m (4,186 ft)
- Population (2022): 5,964
- Time zone: UTC+3 (TRT)
- Postal code: 50140
- Area code: 0384
- Climate: Csb
- Website: www.acigol.bel.tr

Acıgöl (pronounced [ˈadʒɯɡœɫ]), formerly Dobada, is a town in Nevşehir Province in the Central Anatolia region of Turkey. It is the seat of Acıgöl District. Its population is 5,964 (2022). The town lies at an average elevation of 1,276 m (4,186 ft).

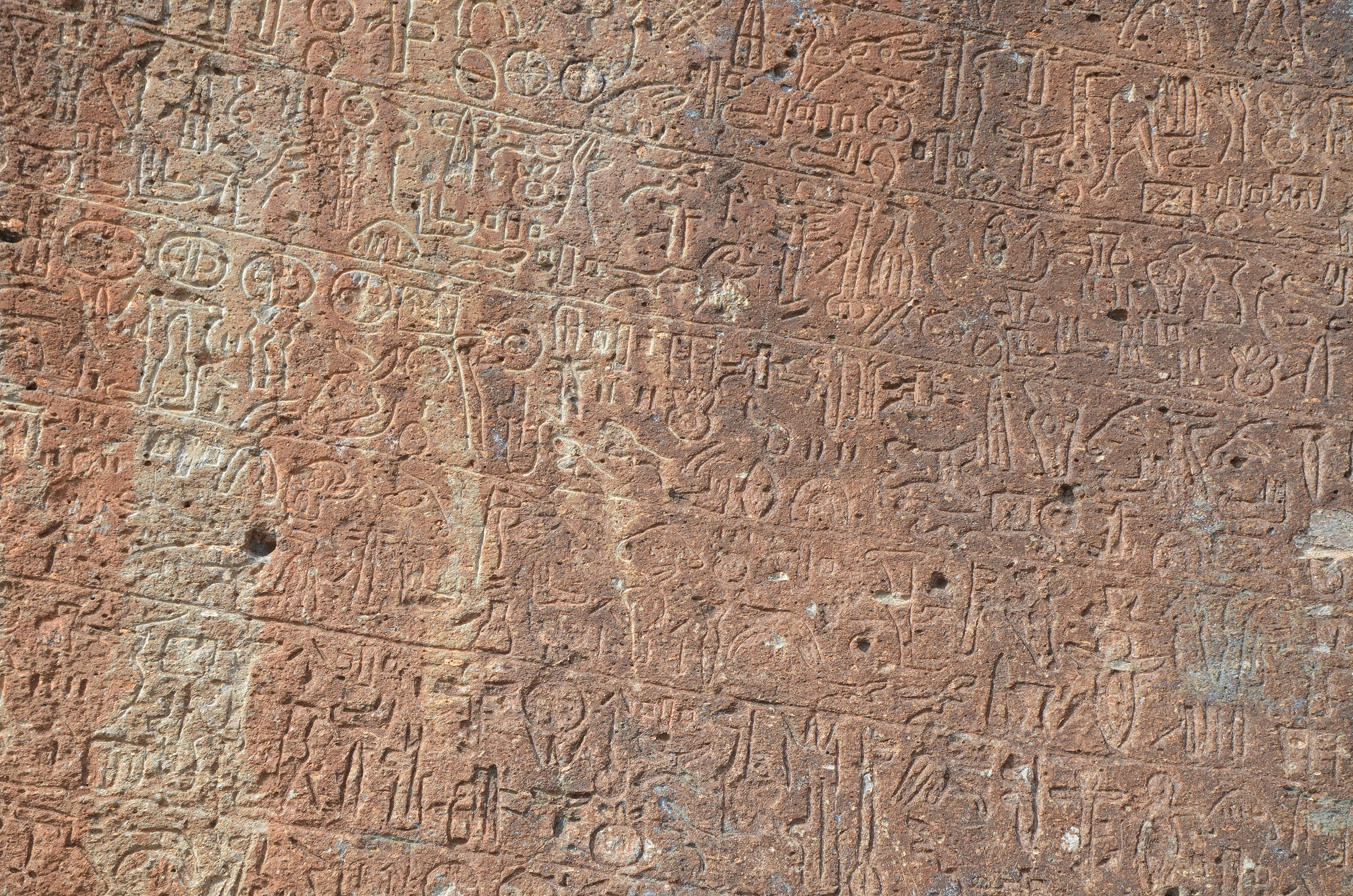
Luwian rock inscription of Topada

Topada rock inscription is located here.

Acıgöl was founded in 1525 by Piri Bey, a dervish from Khorasan and a member of the Qajar tribe of the Oghuz Turks.
