= Attributes of God =

The attributes of God or divine attributes may refer to:

- Attributes of God in Christianity
- Attributes of God in Islam
- Thirteen Attributes of Mercy in Judaism

== See also ==
- God (disambiguation)
