= Varey =

Varey is a surname. Notable people with the surname include:

- David Varey (born 1961), English cricketer
- Frank Varey (1908–1988), English motorcycle speedway racer
- John Varey (1922–1999), British Hispanist
- Matthew Varey (born 1968), Canadian artist and educator

== See also ==
- Battle of Varey (1325), Battle in Ain, France
