= Karen Radner =

Austrian Assyriologist

Karen Radner (11 May 1972) is an Austrian Assyriologist, the Alexander von Humboldt Professor of Ancient History at LMU Munich.

== Early life and education ==
Karen Radner started her studies at the University of Vienna in 1990 in Ancient Near Eastern Languages and Archaeology. She graduated in 1994 with an MA (summa cum laude) and 1997 with a PhD (summa cum laude). Her doctoral work was titled Die neuassyrischen Privatrechtsurkunden als Quelle für Mensch und Umwelt ("The Neo-Assyrian Private Legal Documents as Source for Mankind and Environment"). This study was published in 1997 as part of the State Archives of Assyria Studies Series (Vol. 6) based at the University of Helsinki.

Following her doctoral studies, Radner spent two years in the University of Helsinki as a junior research fellow (1997-1999) and one year at the University of Tübingen as a research fellow (1999). In 1999, Radner moved to LMU Munich as a research assistant and started her Habilitation, which was completed in 2004 and is entitled "Die Macht des Namens. Altorientalische Strategien zur Selbsterhaltung" ("The Power of a Name: Ancient Near Eastern Strategies for Self-Preservation"). This was published in 2005. From 2005 to 2015, Radner worked at University College London as a lecturer, reader, and then professor in Ancient Near Eastern History. During this time, she was also a guest professor at the University of Verona, the University of Innsbruck, UCL Qatar, Doha, and Koç University, Istanbul.

== Humboldt Professorship ==
In 2015, Radner won an Alexander von Humboldt Foundation Award in Classical and Ancient Studies. As part of this award, she received a professorship at LMU Munich, where she is the Alexander von Humboldt-Professur für die Alte Geschichte des Nahen und Mittleren Ostens (Alexander von Humboldt Professor for the Ancient History of the Near and Middle East) as part of the Faculty of History and the Arts, Department of History: Ancient History program. She is also a member of the Center for Advanced Studies at LMU Munich.

== Project leadership ==
Radner has led several projects, including "'Assyrian empire builders:' Governors, Diplomats and Soldiers in the Service of Sargon II and Tiglath-pileser III, Kings of Assyria" and "Knowledge and Power in the Neo-Assyrian Empire".

== Other honors and awards ==
In 2016, Radner was elected to the Bayerische Akademie der Wissenschaften (Bavarian Academy of Sciences and Humanities). Since 2015, Radner has also been an Honorary Professor of Ancient Near Eastern History at University College London.

== Publications ==
- Die neuassyrischen Privatrechtsurkunden als Quelle für Mensch und Umwelt (= State archives of Assyria studies. Band 6). Neo-Assyrian Text Corpus Project, Helsinki 1997, ISBN 951-45-7783-3 (also Dissertation, Vienna 1997).
- The Prosopography of the Neo-Assyrian Empire 1/I: A. Neo-Assyrian Text Corpus Project, Helsinki 1998, ISBN 951-45-8163-6.
- The Prosopography of the Neo-Assyrian Empire 1/II. B–G. Neo-Assyrian Text Corpus Project, Helsinki 1999, ISBN 978-951-45-8645-3.
- Ein neuassyrisches Privatarchiv der Tempelgoldschmiede von Assur (= Studien zu den Assur-Texten. Band 1). Saarbrücker Druckerei und Verlag, Saarbrücken 1999, ISBN 3-930843-44-7 (zugleich Diplomarbeit, Vienna 1994).
- Neuassyrische Rechtsurkunden II (= Wissenschaftliche Veröffentlichungen der Deutschen Orient-Gesellschaft. Band 98). Hinrichs, Leipzig 2000, ISBN 3-930843-58-7.
- Die neuassyrischen Texte aus Tall Šēḫ Ḥamad (= Berichte der Ausgrabung Tall Šēḫ Ḥamad/Dūr-Katlimmu. Band 6). Reimer, Berlin 2002, ISBN 3-496-02746-0.
- Das mittelassyrische Tontafelarchiv von Giricano, Dunnu-sa-Uzibi (= Subartu. Band 14). Brepols, Turnhout 2004, ISBN 2-503-51581-9.
- Die Macht des Namens. Altorientalische Strategien zur Selbsterhaltung (= SANTAG – Arbeiten und Untersuchungen zur Keilschriftskunde. Band 8). Harrassowitz, Wiesbaden 2005, ISBN 3-447-05328-3 (also Habilitationsschrift, Munich 2004).
- as editor with Eleanor Robson: The Oxford Handbook of Cuneiform Culture. Oxford University Press, Oxford 2011, ISBN 978-0-19-955730-1.
- as editor: State Correspondences of the Ancient World from the New Kingdom to the Roman Empire. From New Kingdom Egypt to the Roman Empire (= Oxford Studies in Early Empires). Oxford University Press, Oxford 2014, ISBN 978-0-19-935477-1.
- Ancient Assyria (= Very short introductions. Stimulating ways in to new subjects. Band 424). Oxford University Press, Oxford 2015, ISBN 978-0-19-871590-0.
- with Peter A. Miglus and Franciszek M. Stępniowski: Ausgrabungen in Assur: Wohnquartiere in der Weststadt, Teil I (= Wissenschaftliche Veröffentlichungen der Deutschen Orient-Gesellschaft. Band 152). Harrassowitz, Wiesbaden 2016, ISBN 978-3-447-10742-6.
- as editor with Florian Janoscha Kreppner and Andrea Squitieri: Exploring the Neo-Assyrian Frontier with Western Iran: The 2015 Season at Gird-i Bazar and Qalat-i Dinka (= Peshdar Plain Project Publications. Band 1). PeWe-Verlag, Gladbeck 2016, ISBN 3-935012-20-9 (online).
- as editor with Florian Janoscha Kreppner and Andrea Squitieri: Unearthing the Dinka Settlement Complex: The 2016 Season at Gird-i Bazar and Qalat-i Dinka (= Peshdar Plain Project Publications. Band 2). PeWe-Verlag, Gladbeck 2017, ISBN 978-3-935012-28-7 (online).
- Mesopotamien. Die frühen Hochkulturen an Euphrat und Tigris. Beck, Munich 2017, ISBN 3-406-71406-4.
- The Oxford History of the Ancient Near East: From the Beginnings to Old Kingdom Egypt and the Dynasty of Akkad (multi volume series, 2020–2024, co-editor with Daniel T. Potts and Nadine Moeller).
