= Grant Frame =

American professor (born 1950)

- Born: 1950 (age 75–76)

Academic background
- Education: University of Toronto; University of Chicago

Academic work
- Institutions: University of Pennsylvania

Grant Frame (born 1950) is a Canadian-American Assyriologist, Professor Emeritus of the University of Pennsylvania, and Curator Emeritus of the Babylonian Section of the University of Pennsylvania Museum of Archaeology and Anthropology. He is an expert on Akkadian language and literature and on the history and culture of ancient Mesopotamia in the first millennium BCE, in particular the Neo-Assyrian and Neo-Babylonian periods. Since 2008, he has served as Director and Editor-in-Chief of The Royal Inscriptions of the Neo-Assyrian Period (RINAP), an international research project funded by the U.S. government's National Endowment for the Humanities and other granting agencies, to translate the royal inscriptions of the rulers of Assyria from 744 to 609 BC. The RINAP project marks the continuation of the Royal Inscriptions of Mesopotamia (RIM) project, which Frame's teacher and mentor, Albert Kirk Grayson, founded at the University of Toronto in 1978 and led until his retirement with support from the Social Sciences and Humanities Research Council of Canada.

== Education and career ==
A native of Toronto, Grant Frame attended the Royal York Collegiate Institute before earning a B.A. degree in Near Eastern Studies, with honors, from the University of Toronto. He earned an M.A. degree in Assyriology from the University of Toronto as well. He then pursued his PhD at the University of Chicago, where he earned a PhD in 1981 for a dissertation entitled, Babylonia 689–627 B.C.: A Political History, which he wrote under the supervision of J.A. Brinkman, Simo Parpola, and Erica Reiner. For this study, Frame analyzed cuneiform tablets from several collections, including the British Museum, the Ashmolean Museum, the Vorderasiatische Museum in Berlin, and the Louvre. He traced events from the destruction of Babylon by the Assyrian king Sennacherib in 689 to the death of the Babylonian ruler Kandalanu in 627, a period that witnessed the height of the Neo-Assyrian empire as well as the beginning of the collapse of the Assyrian Empire in Assyria and of the shift of power to Babylonia.

From 1980 to 2006, Grant Frame was a member of the faculty in the Department of Near and Middle Eastern Civilizations (formerly the Department of Near Eastern Studies) at the University of Toronto. During this time, he contributed to the Royal Inscriptions of Mesopotamia Project, by serving as its assistant director and at times as Acting Director.

In 2006, he joined the faculty of the University of Pennsylvania, initially as an Associate Professor in the Department of Near Eastern Languages and Civilizations and ultimately as full Professor. During this time, he was also Associate Curator and later Curator of the Penn Museum's Babylonian Section which contains approximately 30,000 cuneiform clay tablets. From 2017 to 2020 he directed the Center for Ancient Studies at Penn.

== Research and publications ==
The Nederlands Instituut voor het Nabije Oosten published Grant Frame's dissertation as a book in 1992 and issued a second edition in 2007.

As an outgrowth of his work on the University of Toronto's Royal Inscriptions of Mesopotamia project, Grant Frame published Rulers of Babylonia: From the Second Dynasty of Isin to the End of Assyrian Domination (1157–612 BC), in 1995. The University of Toronto Press reprinted this book in 2002 and issued a paperback in 2015.

Frame edited or contributed to many other volumes and published articles in dozens of journals ranging from the Journal of Cuneiform Studies and the Zeitschrift für Assyriologie to the Journal of the Canadian Society for Mesopotamian Studies. He co-wrote exhibition catalogues, such as for a Penn Museum exhibit on magic in the ancient world, and served on the team that produced the Penn Museum's new Middle East Galleries, which opened in 2019. He has delivered public lectures on ancient Near Eastern history and has advised media sources. He spoke in a panel in the BBC Radio World Service series on “Babylon, City of Wonders” which aired in June, 2020.

In his book The Archive of Mušēzib-Marduk, Son of Kiribtu and Descendant of Sîn-nāṣir: A Landowner and Property Developer at Uruk in the Seventh Century BC (2013), Frame published thirty-three cuneiform tablets describing the approximately 45-year career of an individual who bought properties in the city of Uruk in southern Iraq, including in the midst of a major rebellion. This private archive from Babylonia consists of land sale documents, loans with property given as security, and a legal proceeding. The tablets Frame studied come from the British Museum, as well as from the Louvre, the Babylonian collection of Yale University, the Free Library of Philadelphia, the National Museum of Iraq, and the Musée d'Art et d'Histoire in Geneva.

As part of the Royal Inscriptions of the Neo-Assyrian Period project (see below), Frame authored the second volume of the series entitled, The Royal Inscriptions of Sargon II (721–705 BC) (2021, by Eisenbrauns). The volume presents updated English editions with introductory remarks and commentary of 130 royal inscriptions of Sargon II, as well as 11 inscriptions of the royal family and his officials and 10 uncertain inscriptions. These texts are inscribed on various media — including stone wall slabs from his palace, paving slabs, colossi, steles, prisms, and cylinders, among others — originating from all across the ancient Near Eastern world.

Selected publications:

A. K. Grayson, with the assistance of G. Frame and D. Frayne. Assyrian Rulers of the Third and Second Millennia BC (to 1115 BC), by The Royal Inscriptions of Mesopotamia, Assyrian Periods 1. Toronto: University of Toronto Press, 1987; reprinted 2002.

G. Frame. Babylonia 689–627 B.C.: A Political History. Uitgaven van het Nederlands Historisch-Archaeologisch Instituut te Istanbul 69. Istanbul and Leiden: Nederlands Instituut voor het Nabije Oosten, 1992; reprinted 2007.

G. Frame. Rulers of Babylonia: From the Second Dynasty of Isin to the End of Assyrian Domination (1157–612 BC). The Royal Inscriptions of Mesopotamia: Babylonian Periods 2. Toronto: University of Toronto Press, 1995; reprinted 2002 and 2015.

G. Frame, ed., with the assistance of L.S. Wilding. From the Upper Sea to the Lower Sea: Studies on the History of Assyria and Babylonia in Honour of A.K. Grayson. Uitgaven van het Nederlands Instituut voor het Nabije Oosten te Leiden 101. Istanbul and Leiden: Nederlands Instituut voor het Nabije Oosten, 2004.

E. Leichty, with a contribution by Grant Frame. The Royal Inscriptions of Esarhaddon, King of Assyria (680–669 BC). Royal Inscriptions of the Neo-Assyrian Period 4. Winona Lake, IN: Eisenbrauns, 2011.

G. Frame, E.V. Leichty, K. Sonik, J. Tigay, and S. Tinney, eds. A Common Cultural Heritage: Mesopotamia and the Biblical World. Studies in Honor of Dr. Barry L. Eichler. Bethesda, MD: CDL Press, 2011.

G. Frame, The Archive of Mušēzib-Marduk, Son of Kiribtu and Descendant of Sîn-nāṣir: A Landowner and Property Developer at Uruk in the Seventh Century BC. Babylonische Archive 5. Dresden: ISLET, 2013.

G. Frame, with the collaboration of A. Fuchs for two inscriptions. The Royal Inscriptions of Sargon II (721–705 BC). The Royal Inscriptions of the Neo-Assyrian Period 2. University Park, PA: Eisenbrauns, 2021.

G. Frame, with the collaboration of A. Fuchs for two inscriptions. The Royal Inscriptions of Sargon II (721–705 BC) Addendum. The Royal Inscriptions of the Neo-Assyrian Period 2. University Park, PA: Eisenbrauns, 2021.

G. Frame, J. Jeffers, and H. Pittman, eds. Ur in the Twenty-First Century CE: Proceedings of the 62nd Rencontre Assyriologique Internationale, Philadelphia, July 11–15, 2016. Winona Lake, Indiana: Eisenbrauns 2021.

G. Frame and S. Parpola. The Correspondence of Assurbanipal, Part II: Letters from Southern Babylonia. State Archives of Assyria 22. Helsinki: Neo-Assyrian Text Corpus Project, 2023.

J. Novotny, J. Jeffers and G. Frame. The Royal Inscriptions of Ashurbanipal (668–631 BC), Aššur-etel-ilāni (630–627 BC), and Sîn-šarra-iškun (626–612 BC), Kings of Assyria, Part 3. The Royal Inscriptions of the Neo-Assyrian Period 5/3. University Park, Pennsylvania: Eisenbrauns, 2023.

Selected article:

G. Frame, "A “New” Cylinder Inscription of Sargon II of Assyria from Melid", in 'Of God(s), Trees, Kings, and Scholars Neo-Assyrian and Related Studies in Honour of Simo Parpola', Studia Orientalia Published by the Finnish Oriental Society 106, Helsinki 2009, pp. 65–82

G. Frame, "Babylon: Assyria's Problem and Assyria's Prize, The Canadian Society for Mesopotamian Studies, Vol.3 2008, pp.21-31

G. Frame, "The Tell Acharneh Stela of Sargon II of Assyria in TELL 'ACHARNEH 1998-2004, Subartu XVIII, Brepols 2006, Michel Fortin (editor), pp. 49–68

G. Frame, "The Inscription of Sargon II at Tang-i Var," Orientalia 68 (1999), pp. 31–57

G. Frame" "The Inscription of Sargon II at Tang-i Var, (Figures 1-18)" Orientalia 68 (1999)

== Royal Inscriptions of the Neo-Assyrian Period: RIM and RINAP Projects ==
As a faculty member for many years at the University of Toronto, Grant Frame contributed to the Royal Inscriptions of Mesopotamia Project, for as assistant director under the leadership of Professor A. Kirk Grayson. Grayson retired in 2000 and ceded responsibility to Frame. Shifting the focus to examine inscriptions to the Neo-Assyrian period, Frame established the Royal Inscriptions of the Neo-Assyrian Period, or RINAP, and assembled a team to translate all known royal inscriptions of the Neo-Assyrian kings from the era of Tiglath-pileser III (who ruled from 744-727 BCE through the era of Sin-shar-ishkun (ruled 627–612 BCE). RINAP secured funding from the National Endowment for the Humanities in order to produce editions in printed volumes and in a fully searchable and indexed online format. The translations cover thousands of texts that survive on clay tablets and cylinders, and in inscriptions on walls, objects, and other materials, from the region corresponding to what is now Iraq, Syria, Iran, and Turkey. So far several volumes of translations from the RINAP project have appeared in print from the publisher Eisenbrauns.
