= Parpola =

Parpola is a Finnish surname. Notable people with the surname include:

- Asko Parpola (born 1941), Finnish Indologist and Sindhologist
- Simo Parpola (born 1943) Finnish Assyriologist, brother of Asko
