= Simo Parpola =

Finnish assyriologist (born 1943)

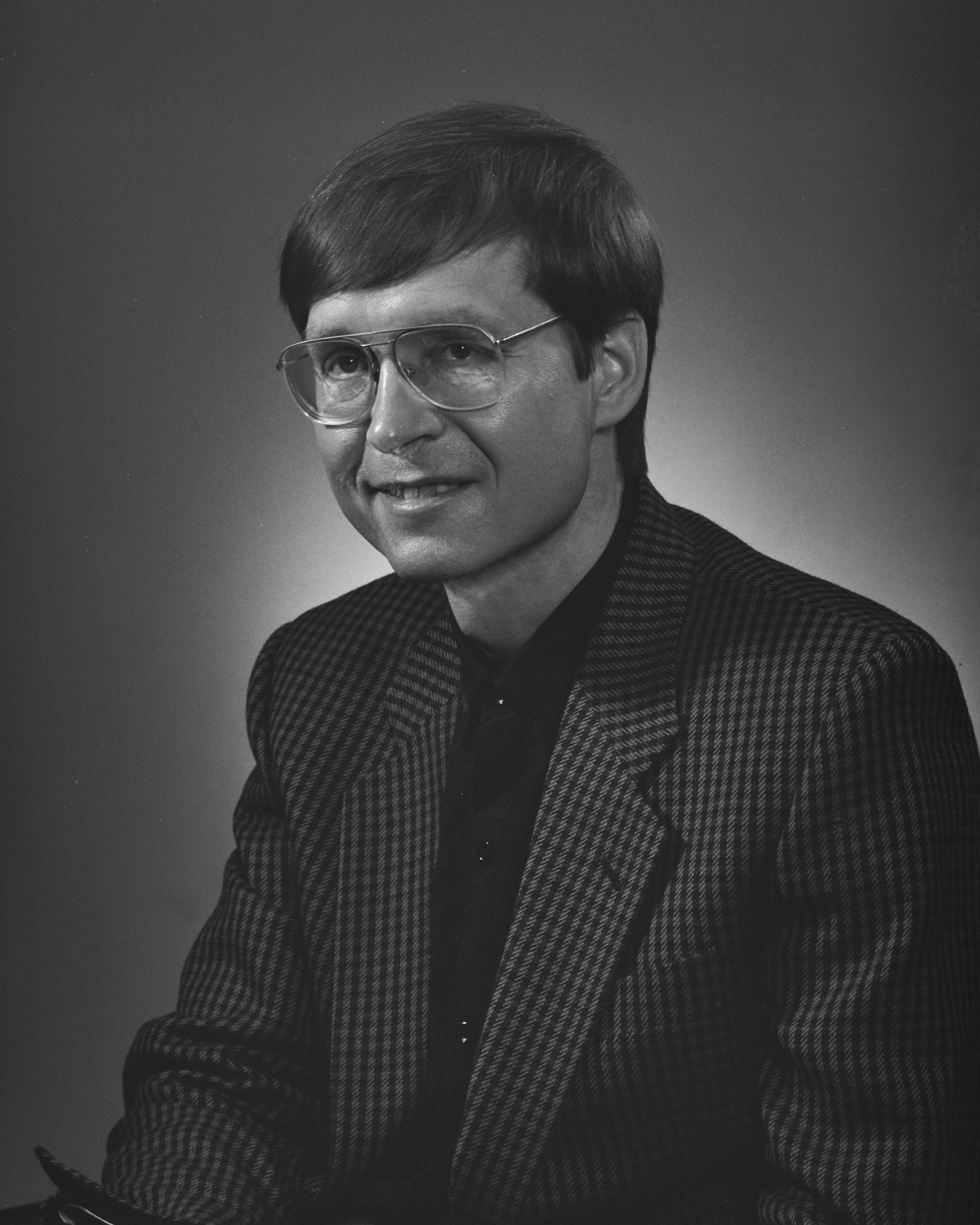
- Parpola in 1993
- Born: Simo Kaarlo Antero Parpola; 4 July 1943 (age 83); Helsinki, Finland
- Occupation: Assyriologist
- Title: Extraordinary Professor of Assyriology
- Relatives: Asko Parpola (brother)

Academic work
- Discipline: Assyriology
- Institutions: University of Helsinki (retired)

Simo Kaarlo Antero Parpola (born 4 July 1943) is a Finnish Assyriologist specializing in the Neo-Assyrian Empire and Professor emeritus of Assyriology at the University of Helsinki (retired fall 2009).

== Career ==
Simo Parpola studied Assyriology, Classics and Semitic Philology at the University of Helsinki, the Pontifical Biblical Institute and the British Museum in 1961–1968. He completed his PhD in Helsinki and began his academic career as Wissenschaftlicher Assistent of Karlheinz Deller at the Seminar für Sprachen und Kulturen des Vorderen Orients of the University of Heidelberg in 1969. Between 1973 and 1976 he was Docent of Assyriology and Research Fellow at the University of Helsinki, and from 1977 to 1979 associate professor of Assyriology with tenure at the Oriental Institute of the University of Chicago. He was appointed extraordinary professor of Assyriology at the University of Helsinki in 1978 and has directed the University's Neo-Assyrian Text Corpus Project since 1986. He taught at the University of Padua as visiting professor in spring 1995, and worked as research fellow in the Institute for Advanced Studies, Hebrew University in 1999. He contributed to the compilation of the Chicago Assyrian Dictionary from 1982 until its completion in 2010 and partook in the Ziyaret Tepe archaeological expedition as Senior Epigraphist in 2001–2006. Among Simo Parpola's students of Assyriology were Amar Annus, Sanna Aro, Grant Frame, Mikko Luukko, Raija Mattila, and Saana Svärd.

== Research ==
=== Overview ===
The main focus of Parpola's research has been on the study of the Neo-Assyrian Empire in all its aspects (language, literature, history, geography, society, religion, royal ideology and sciences), but he has also contributed to the study of the Indus script, Sumerian language, Jewish mysticism and Assyrian identity in post-empire times, among others. In 1986 he initiated a long-term international research project to edit Neo-Assyrian sources (The Neo-Assyrian Text Corpus Project), which has resulted in a 19-volume series of standard text editions (State Archives of Assyria) and in a digital corpus of texts written in the Neo-Assyrian language. The published series contains cuneiform texts, transcriptions and translations of first hand records written by civil servants, professionals and administrators and are considered to be an important source accessible to scholars of many disciplines. In 1998, Parpola started the Melammu Project, an interdisciplinary project that investigates the continuity, transformation and diffusion of Mesopotamian culture in the classical world and thereafter.

=== "The Assyrian roots of Christianity" ===
Parpola, in a study published in 2004 entitled: Mount Nisir and the Foundations of the Assyrian Church, argues that the Christian church was "..built on foundations laid by Assyria..", and that "..the continuity and survival of Assyrian ideas in Christianity must be taken seriously." He comes to this conclusion by assessing what he considers to be parallels in both Christianity and the ancient Mesopotamian religion, and states that Assyriologists generally avoid and reject the belief structure and central components in regards to ancient Mesopotamia.

== Academic honours ==
- Finnish Professor of the Year, 1992.
- J. V. Snellman Public Information Award of the University of Helsinki, 1996.
- Honorary Member of the American Oriental Society, 2001.
- Honorary Member of the Finnish Science Center, Heureka, 2003.

Member of the Norwegian Academy of Science and Letters from 1995.

== Works ==
=== Books ===
- Etymological Dictionary of the Sumerian Language I-II. Winona Lake: Eisenbrauns, 2016.
- (Editor-in-chief) Assyrian-English-Assyrian Dictionary. Winona Lake: Eisenbrauns, 2008. ISBN 978-952-10-1332-4
- (with Michael Porter) The Helsinki Atlas of the Ancient Near East in the Neo-Assyrian Period. Helsinki: The Neo-Assyrian Text Corpus Project, 2001.
- (with Veysel Donbaz) Neo-Assyrian Legal Texts in Istanbul. Studien zu den Assur-Texten, Bd. 2. Saarbücken: Deutsche Orient-Gesellschaft, 2001. ISBN 978-3-930843-64-0
- (with Andreas Fuchs) The Correspondence of Sargon II, Part III: Letters from Media and Babylonia. State Archives of Assyria 15. Helsinki University Press, 2001.
- Assyrian Prophecies. State Archives of Assyria 9. Helsinki University Press, 1997.
- The Standard Babylonian Epic of Gilgamesh. State Archives of Assyria Cuneiform Texts 1. Helsinki: The Neo-Assyrian Text Corpus Project, 1997.
- Letters from Assyrian and Babylonian Scholars. State Archives of Assyria 10. Helsinki University Press, 1993.
- (With T. Kwasman) Legal Transactions of the Royal Court of Nineveh, Part I: Tiglath-Pileser III through Esarhaddon. State Archives of Assyria 6. Helsinki University Press, 1991.
- (With G. B. Lanfranchi) The Correspondence of Sargon II, Part II: Letters from the Northern and Northeastern Provinces. State Archives of Assyria 5. Helsinki University Press, 1990.
- (With Kazuko Watanabe) Neo-Assyrian Treaties and Loyalty Oaths. State Archives of Assyria 2. Helsinki University Press, 1988. ISBN 978-951-570-034-6
- The Correspondence of Sargon II, Part I: Letters from Assyria and the West. State Archives of Assyria 1. Helsinki University Press, 1987.
- Letters from Assyrian Scholars to the Kings Esarhaddon and Assurbanipal, Part II: Commentary and Appendices. Alter Orient und Altes Testament 5/2, Neukirchen-Vluyn: Butzon & Bercker, 1983.
- Cuneiform Texts from Babylonian Tablets in the British Museum, Part 53: Neo-Assyrian Letters from the Kuyunjik Collection. London, 1979.
- (With A. Parpola and S. Koskenniemi) A Concordance to the Indus Inscriptions. Annales Academiae Scientiarum Fennicae, Series B 185. Helsinki, 1973.
- Neo-Assyrian Toponyms. Alter Orient und Altes Testament 6, Neukirchen-Vluyn: Butzon & Bercker, 1970.
- (With A. Parpola, S. Koskenniemi and P. Aalto) Decipherment of the Proto-Dravidian Inscriptions of the Indus Civilization. Scandinavian Institute of Asian Studies, Special Publications 1. Copenhagen, 1969.

=== Articles ===
- "Mount Nisir and the Foundations of the Assyrian Church", pp. 469–484 in Salvatore Gaspa et al. (eds.), From Source to History: Studies on Ancient Near Eastern Worlds and Beyond Dedicated to G. B. Lanfranchi. Alter Orient und Altes Testament 412. Münster: Ugarit-Verlag, 2014.
- "Globalization of Religion: Jewish Cosmology in its Ancient Near Eastern Context", pp. 15–27 in Markham J. Geller (ed.), Melammu: The Ancient World in an Age of Globalization. Proceedings of the Sixth Symposium of the Melammu Project. Max Plack Research Library for the History and Development of Knowledge, Proceedings 7. Berlin, 2014.
- "The Etymology of the Sumerian Word for Star", pp. 29–43 in Antonio Panaino (ed.), Non licet stare caelestibus: Studies on Astronomy and Its History offered to Salvo De Meis. Indo-Iranica et Orientalia. Milano: Mimesis, 2014.
- "Sumerian: A Uralic Language (I)," pp. 181–210 in Leonid Kogan et al. (eds.), Language in the Ancient Near East. Proceedings of the 53^{e} Rencontre Assyriologique Internationale, Vol. I, Pt. 2 (Babel und Bibel 4/2). Winona Lake, Indiana: Eisenbrauns, 2010.
- "Sumerian: A Uralic Language (II)," Babel und Bibel 6 (2012), 269–322.
- "The Neo-Assyrian Royal Harem," pp. 613–626 in G. B. Lanfranchi et al. (eds.), Leggo! Studies presented to Frederick Mario Fales on the Occasion of his 65th Birthday. Wiesbaden: Harrassowitz, 2012.
- "Cuneiform Texts from Ziyaret Tepe (Tušhan), 2002-2003," State Archives of Assyria Bulletin 17 (2008), 1–113, Plates I-XXV.
- "The Neo-Assyrian Ruling Class," pp. 257–274 in Thomas R. Kämmerer (ed.), Studien zur Ritual und Sozialgeschichte im Alten Orient / Studies on Ritual and Society in the Ancient Near East. Beihefte zur Zeitschrift für die alttestamentliche Wissenschaft, Bd. 374. Berlin: Walter de Gruyter, 2007.
- "Il retroterra assiro di Ahiqar", pp. 91–112 in Ricccardo Contini and Cristiano Grottanelli, (eds.), Il saggio Ahiqar. Brescia: Paideia, 2005.
- "National and Ethnic Identity in the Neo-Assyrian Empire and Assyrian Identity in Post-Empire Times," Journal of Assyrian Academic Studies 18/2 (2004), 5-49.
- "The Originality of the Teachings of Zarathustra in the Light of Yasna 44", pp. 373–383 in Ch. Cohen et al. (eds.), Sefer Moshe. The Moshe Weinfeld Jubilee Volume. Winona Lake: Eisenbrauns, 2004.
- "Mesopotamian Precursors of the Hymn of the Pearl", pp. 181–193 in R.M. Whiting (ed.), Mythology and Mythologies. Methodological Approaches to Intercultural Influences. Melammu Symposia 2. Helsinki, 2001.
- "The Magi and the Star", Bible Review 6 (2001), 16-23 and 52–54.
- "Assyrians after Assyria": Journal of the Assyrian Academic Society 12 (2000), 1-16
- "The Mesopotamian Soul of Western Culture": Bulletin of the Canadian Society of Mesopotamian Studies 35 (2000), 29-41
- "Monotheism in Ancient Assyria", pp. 165–209 in Barbara Nevling Porter (ed.), One God or Many? Concepts of Divinity in the Ancient World. Casco Bay, 2000.
- "Sons of God: The Ideology of Assyrian Kingship": Archaeology Odyssey 2/5 (1999), 16–27.
- "The Concept of the Saviour and Belief in Resurrection in Ancient Mesopotamia": Academia Scientiarum Fennica, Year Book 1997, 51–58.
- "The Man Without a Scribe and the Question of Literacy in the Assyrian Empire", pp. 315–324 in Beate Pongratz-Leisten et al. (eds.), Ana šadê Labnāni lū allik. Festschrift für Wolfgang Röllig. Alter Orient und Altes Testament 247. Neukirchen-Vluyn, 1997.
- "The Assyrian Cabinet", pp. 379–401 in M. Dietrich and O. Loretz (eds.), Vom Alten Orient zum Alten Testament. Festschrift für Wolfram Freiherrn von Soden zum 85. Geburtstag. Alter Orient und Altes Testament 240. Neukirchen-Vluyn, 1995.
- "The Assyrian Tree of Life: Tracing the Origins of Jewish Monotheism and Greek Philosophy": Journal of Near Eastern Studies 52 (1993), 161–208.
- Parpola, Simo (1993). "Mesopotamian Astrology and Astronomy as Domains of the Mesopotamian 'Wisdom'". In Galter, H. (ed.). Die Rolle der Astronomie in den Kulturen Mesopotamiens (PDF). pp. 47–60 – via University of Pennsylvania.
- (With J. Neumann) "Climatic Change and the 11th-10th Century Eclipse of Assyria and Babylonia": Journal of Near Eastern Studies 46 (1987), 161–182.
- "Assyrian Library Records": Journal of Near Eastern Studies 42 (1983), 1-29
- "Assyrian Royal Inscriptions and Neo-Assyrian Letters", pp. 117–142 in F. M. Fales, ed., Assyrian Royal Inscriptions: New Horizons in Literary, Ideological and Historical Analysis. Rome, 1981.
- "The Murderer of Sennacherib", pp. 171–182 in Bendt Alster (ed.), Death in Mesopotamia. Copenhagen, 1980

== See also ==
- Asko Parpola
- Panbabylonism
