= Royal York Collegiate Institute =

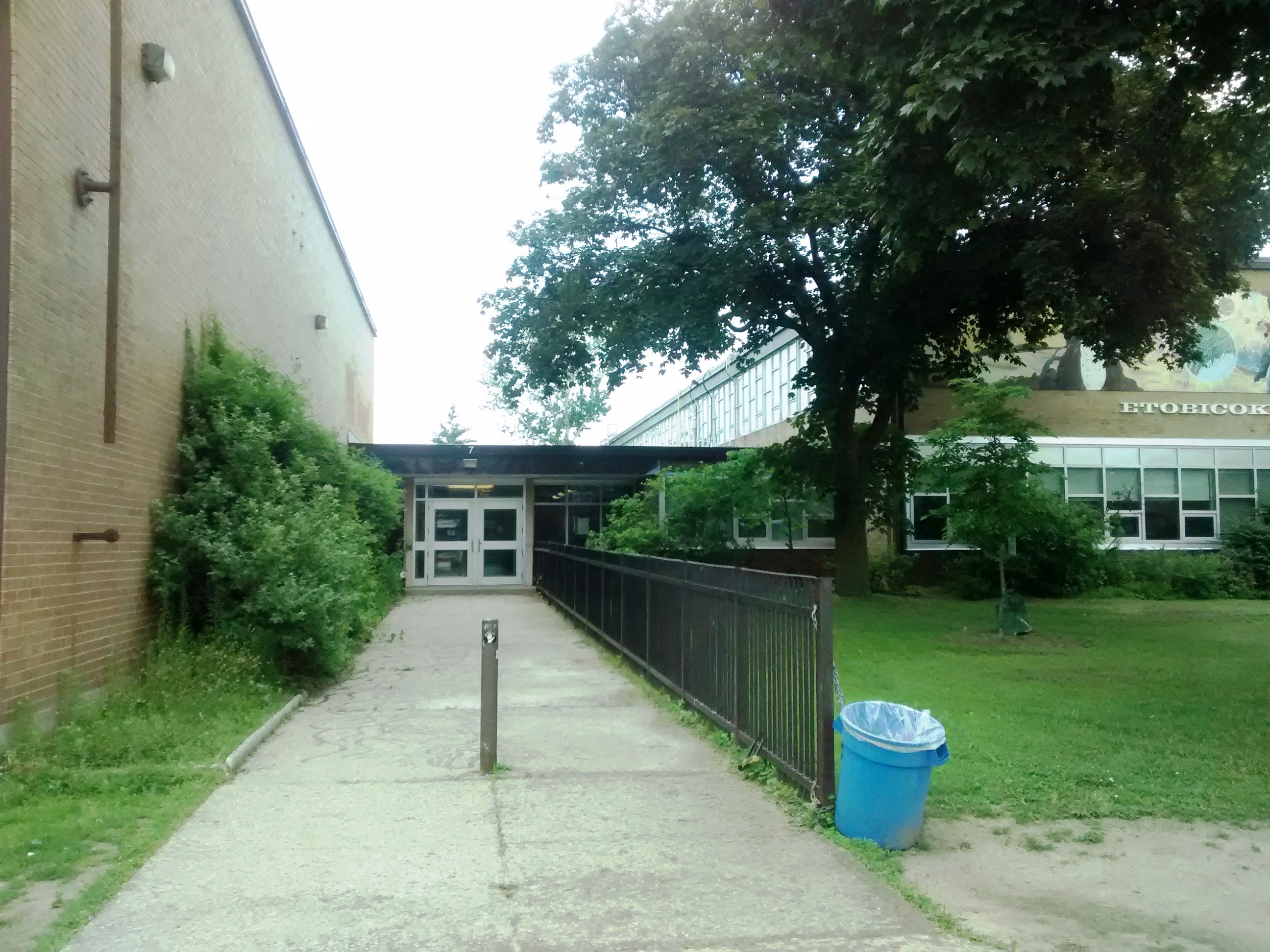

Location
- 675 Royal York Road; Etobicoke, Toronto, Ontario, M8Y 2T1; Canada; 43.631075°N 79.503706°W

Information
- Former names: Royal York Secondary School (1953–c. 1960)
- School type: High School
- Motto: Cum Aliis, Pro Aliis (With others, For others)
- Religious affiliation: Secular
- Founded: 1953
- Status: Active (occupied by Etobicoke School of the Arts)
- Closed: 1982
- School board: Toronto District School Board (Etobicoke Board of Education)
- Superintendent: Beth Butcher; LC1, Executive Superintendent; Tracy Hayhurst; LN20
- Area trustee: Patrick Nunziata; Ward 3
- School number: 939471
- Grades: 9–13
- Language: English
- Colours: Purple and Gold
- Team name: Royal York Bears (junior football); Royal York Lords (senior football)
- Public transit access: TTC: North/South: 73 Royal York, 76 Royal York South: West/East: 69 Queensway; Rapid Transit: Royal York
- Website: royalyorkcollegiateinstitute.blogspot.ca

Royal York Collegiate Institute (Royal York CI, RYCI, or Royal York), previously Royal York Secondary School is a former public high school that existed from 1953 to 1982 under the Etobicoke Board of Education (now known as the Toronto District School Board) in The Queensway – Humber Bay neighbourhood of the Etobicoke district in Toronto, Ontario, Canada. It was the first academic high school built in Etobicoke after World War II.

== History ==
Royal York C.I. was constructed in 1952 and opened on September 8, 1953. The school was designed by architect Gordon Adamson. The auditorium was later erected in 1957. The girls' Jr. volleyball team won the Borough of Etobicoke Girls' Interschool Volleyball Championship on February 21, 1968.

== Notable alumni ==
- Tom Anselmi, Canadian sports executive
- Grant Frame, Assyriologist, Professor Emeritus of the University of Pennsylvania, and Curator Emeritus of the Babylonian Section of the Penn Museum

== See also ==
- List of high schools in Ontario
- Etobicoke School of the Arts
