= Etobicoke School of the Arts =

Public arts high school in Toronto, Canada

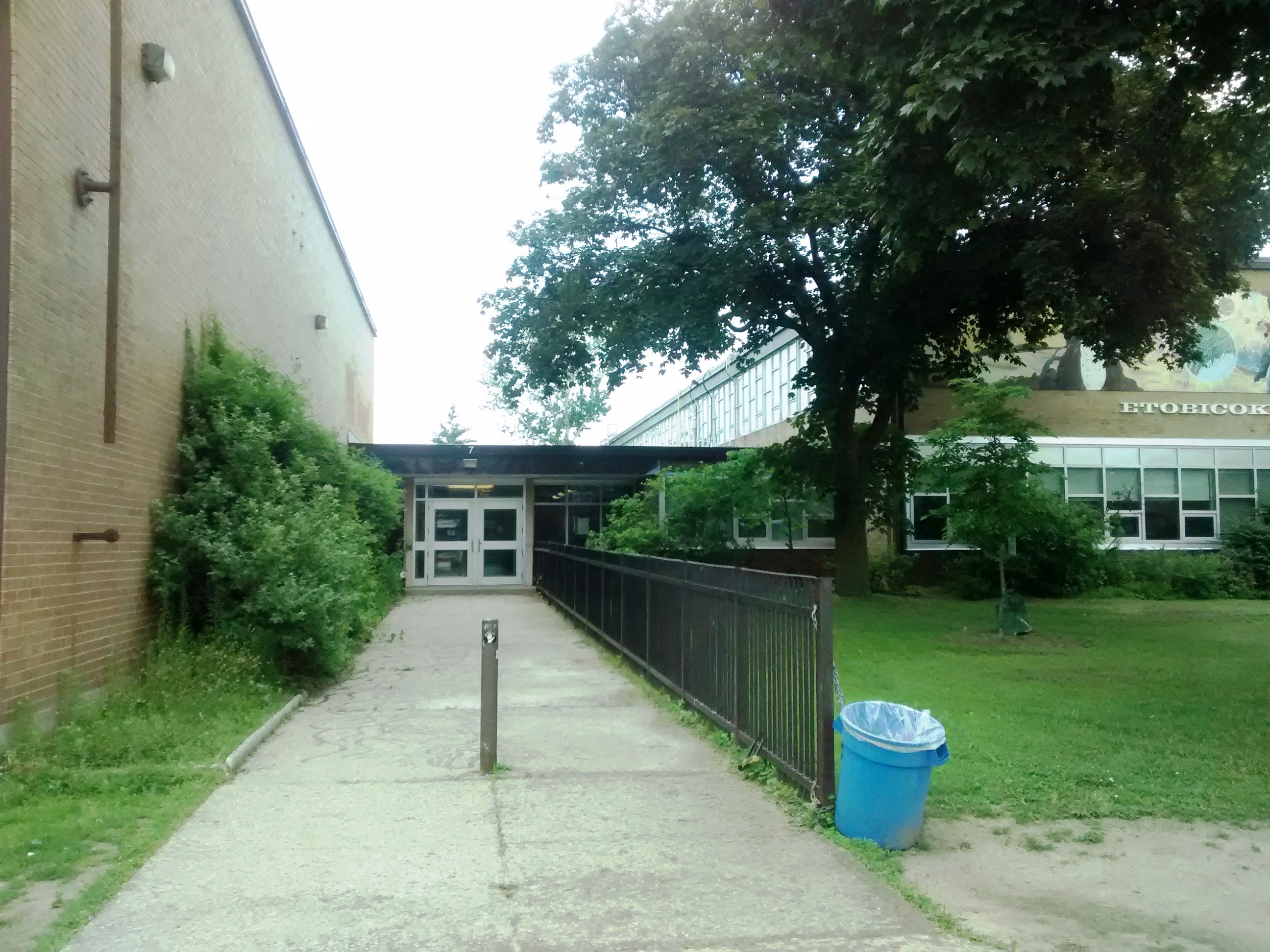

Location
- 675 Royal York Road; Toronto, Ontario, M8Y 2T1; Canada; 43°37′52″N 79°30′13″W

Information
- School type: Public Arts High School
- Motto: Vita Brevis Est, Ars Longa (Life is brief, art is long)
- Founded: 1981
- School board: Toronto District School Board (Etobicoke Board of Education)
- Superintendent: Tracy Hayhurst
- Area trustee: Patrick Nunziata
- School number: 2905 / 909602
- Principal: Dritan Bylykbashi
- Grades: 9–12
- Enrolment: 917 (2019-20)
- Language: English
- Colours: Blue, Gold
- Mascot: Eagle
- Team name: ESA Eagles
- Yearbook: The Muse
- Website: www.esainfo.ca
- Last updated: December 28, 2016

The Etobicoke School of the Arts (ESA) is a specialized public arts-academic high school in Toronto, Ontario, Canada. Located in Etobicoke, it has been housed in the former Royal York Collegiate Institute facility since 1983. Founded on September 8, 1981, the Etobicoke School of the Arts has the distinction of being the oldest, free standing, arts-focused high school in Canada.

== Overview ==
ESA is part of the Toronto District School Board and accepts students from all over southern Ontario from Grade 9 to 12. The school runs on a two-day schedule with 4 periods a day. Each week is either week A, or week B, and based on which week it is, the 2 afternoon classes are switched in order to ensure a student does not miss the same class every week for rehearsals or appointments. The female-to-male ratio of the school is about 4 to 1.

The school has been publicized in multiple magazines such as Maclean's, The Toronto Star and in a national newspaper, The Globe and Mail. As well, in the September 2006 issue of the Toronto arts magazine Toronto Life, ESA was named Toronto's best arts high school and is also widely known as the best arts high school in Canada. The school was the feature of CTV's Canada AM in September 2006.

== History ==
By the late 1970s The Etobicoke Board of Education had gone through the process of closing over thirty schools because of a dramatic decline in enrolment, which dropped from 65,000 to fewer than 35,000 pupils. In spite of this, the senior staff felt compelled to resume innovative programs that had characterized the Board during the 1960s and 1970s. One idea had been talked about in the program department was a school for artistic students.

In the fall of 1979, the board visited the Fiorello H. LaGuardia High School of Music & Art and Performing Arts in New York City. They came away convinced that a successful arts school would have to have an exclusive program, that is, a program that would function on its own, without sharing space within an existing secondary school. To ensure that the right students enrolled, they also agreed that admission would be subject to an audition.

The school was opened on September 8, 1981 at a closed Queensway Senior School.

In September 1983 ESA moved to its current home in the building of Royal York Collegiate Institute which had been closed in June 1982. The school gained a strong reputation over the next decade as one of Toronto's best secondary schools. Students began to apply from all over the Greater Toronto Area and southern Ontario.

== Application and audition process ==
Students are accepted into their chosen field, namely drama, dance, contemporary art, music (band or strings), film and musical theatre, after undergoing an application process and passing an audition the year before.

They must submit their grade seven, last term report card and grade eight, first term report card. They must also submit a filled-out form indicating their preference of arts major(s) and minor, their preference of academic subjects (academic, applied or locally developed) and their past instruction in their area(s) of interest.

As part of the audition process, they must write an essay on a suggested topic (known only on the day of the audition and written on location) and undergo an interview with some distinguished individuals from the school (graduates, instructors, etc.) in their area of interest. Each year approximately 1000 students are auditioned and 200 students are accepted, primarily at the grade 9 level; however, some students may be accepted at higher grade levels should places become available.

== The arts ==
ESA offers artistic programs for students who successfully complete the audition process in the major of their choice, namely Drama, Dance, Contemporary Art, Film, Music (Band or Strings), and musical theatre. At ESA students have the chance to work with an experienced arts faculty as well as numerous professional "visiting artists".

=== Drama ===
Mainstage, the departments headliner production presented each year in the Nancy Main Theatre, has been held since the school opened in 1981. The department participates in many competitions such as the Sears Ontario Drama Festival where it has won many awards in its history.

The curriculum of the Drama Department is broken up into four years, each year building on the last. With the culmination of this work, students produce their Drama Showcases, performed through the final months of the school year. In September 2012 a new acting for the camera program was added at the grade 11 and 12 level; this elective program is open to all students regardless of their major.

=== Contemporary art ===
The Contemporary Art Department is responsible for the teaching of contemporary arts and contemporary photography practice at ESA. In 1981 the department began with two teachers and a handful of students.

The department has created several murals and pieces on commission. Some of the murals have included those for Norseman Public School, Humber Valley Village School, Future Bakery, Toronto City Hall, the Daily Bread Foodbank and Woodbine Race Track.

As well as exhibitions at ESA, many off-campus shows have also been held. Notable exhibitions were held at during Nuit Blanche 2009 & 2016, Saatchi Gallery, Albright-Knox Art Gallery, Harbourfront, Praxis, Clint Roenisch Gallery, Gallery 44, Whippersnapper Gallery, and Artscape Youngplace.

In 2016, Matthew Varey, head of the Contemporary Art department, won the Canadian Art Teacher of the Year award from the Canadian Society for Education through Art. ESA students also broke a record, winning 53% of all international Scholastic Arts & Writing Awards.

=== Music ===
The Music Department is divided into two streams: Strings and Band. The head of Strings is Mrs. Betteger while the head of Band is Mr. Freeman. In addition to the student's choice of study, all Grade 9 and 10 students must take Theory, or Rudiments. Grade 12 students have the option of taking Orchestration, and students from both Grade 11 and 12 have the option of taking Repertoire instead of Theory.

In Grade 9 and 10, students begin to perfect their skills, technique, and overall ability, both as individual performers and ensemble players in groups. Theory consists of the History of Music and basic theory work taken from the RCM Elementary and Grade 1 Rudiments Curriculum. Guided by their theory and instrumental teacher, students strive for personal improvement, both in their practical classes and in theory work. In Grades 11 and 12, students move towards perfecting a personal playing style and their technique.

In Theory, Grade 11 students complete the History of Music, and gain proficiency in fields such as composition, harmonization, and listening skills. The Orchestration course available to students in Grade 12, includes a History component and hones abilities pertaining to writing, transposing and organizing music.

The culmination of a music student's career at ESA is their Grade 12 recital. Students are responsible for mounting a full musical recital, including rehearsals, staging, lighting, and publicity. They may choose to perform alone, or in groups of 2-3 members.

=== Dance ===
The dance department teaches ballet, modern and jazz techniques. Students work with experienced teachers and choreographers, as well as a wide variety of guest artists. The programme focuses on building dance & performance skills while also learning about composition, anatomy, dance conditioning and somatic practices, and history.

The department runs two extracurricular dance companies. 'DancESAtion' is a modern dance company directed by department staff. In the past, this company has performed in many professional settings, including with the Toronto Symphony Orchestra. 'Refresh' is a student run hip hop crew that performs at a variety of shows throughout the year.

All dance students have multiple performance opportunities each year. In the fall, students an opportunity to present their own original choreography at the annual Choreographic Workshop. The show is made up of student work, class pieces, work from 'DancESAtion' and 'Refresh', choreography by staff and guest artists. In the spring, the dance department puts on a year-end show called Dance Night, involving all dance majors and company members.

=== Musical Theatre ===
The Music Theatre program offers students an opportunity to study three disciplines in one major. Throughout their four years in the program they are trained in vocal music, dance, and drama. as their requirement for this program. Aside from these requirements music theatre students also learn music theory as one of their compulsory courses.

The Music Theatre program puts together a musical every year, varying performances either in late May or in March. This musical is exclusive to the Grade 11s and 12s, and often alternates between a pre-existing musical and a musical composed of songs from multiple musicals, as well as scenes interspersed. They are also responsible for the annual Showcase, a similar event with songs from various musicals, exclusive to the Grades 9s and 10s.

=== Film ===
Film is the school's newest major and was founded in the 2008-2009 school year. The film program explores the study of cinematography, film production, handling of film equipment, writing, et cetera.

Throughout the year film has several different showcases such as the 60 second film festival in December and the Summer film festival in June amongst several others that are open to all of the students participating in the major. In its first year alone the film program received much attention, not only from Canada, but from around the world. Many students of the film program have participated and received awards and recognition in various film festivals worldwide.

Additionally the Film Program has worked to build links with the outside film community. The department has built a relationship with Shaftesbury Films who have given them access to their experts in the field. Over the years, the film program has also had the opportunity to speak with individuals such as Nancy Beiman, Peter Raymont, Laurent Cantet and most recently Daniel Roher

== Performances ==
Every year, the school puts on a variety of shows and performances that vary each year. The shows demonstrate each of the six majors, and the students, and display them in a way that benefits each.

The Drama Department puts on a yearly production known as "Mainstage". The Dance Department produce "Dance Night" in which all the dance students perform, most notably ESA's dance company "DancESAtion". The department also produces two choreographic workshops of staff and student pieces which perform in the fall and spring.

The Contemporary Art Department hosts an annual art show which student artwork is showcased and sold, which is also its largest fundraiser. They also produce "Portfolio Day", one of the largest international high school art events, where students meet with visiting post-secondary institutions.

The Music and Musical Theatre Departments conduct three performances each year: the December holiday concert, "Festive Celebration", a spring music showcase "Opus", and the culminating production of the annual Musical.

There are many student-run shows occurring every year, including the following largest three: Because I am a Girl, Black History Month, and the Asian Student Art Show.

During the year, a concert called "Solstice" is put on. Solstice is a school concert near the end of the year strictly for the students enjoyment. These concerts usually include "rock" styled bands which play a variety of music from rock and roll, indie, ska, jazz, blues, fusion and many others. Previously, a similar music event "Goatstock" was held. Goatstock served as a fundraiser for World Vision.

== Academics ==
Most standard Ontario curriculum courses are offered, including classes in the social sciences, science, math, languages and physical education. A very high number of students exceed provincial levels in standardised tests, including both the Grade 10 Literacy Test and the Grade 9 EQAO math test which are nationally recognised benchmarks set by the EQAO.

== Extracurricular ==
For many years the music department has participated in and won numerous awards at the Kiwanis Music Festival.

In 2007, ESA's photography students participated in Gallery 44's exhibition Cameralinks 2007 - URBAN. Since 2013, ESA Photography students have participated in the Magenta Foundation's Flash Forward Incubator Program.

In 2023, Musical Theatre students Lexi Roth and William Bastianon created Curtain Call Concerts, a student-directed bi-monthly musical theatre cabaret that showcases the talents of juniors and seniors at the school.

== Facilities ==
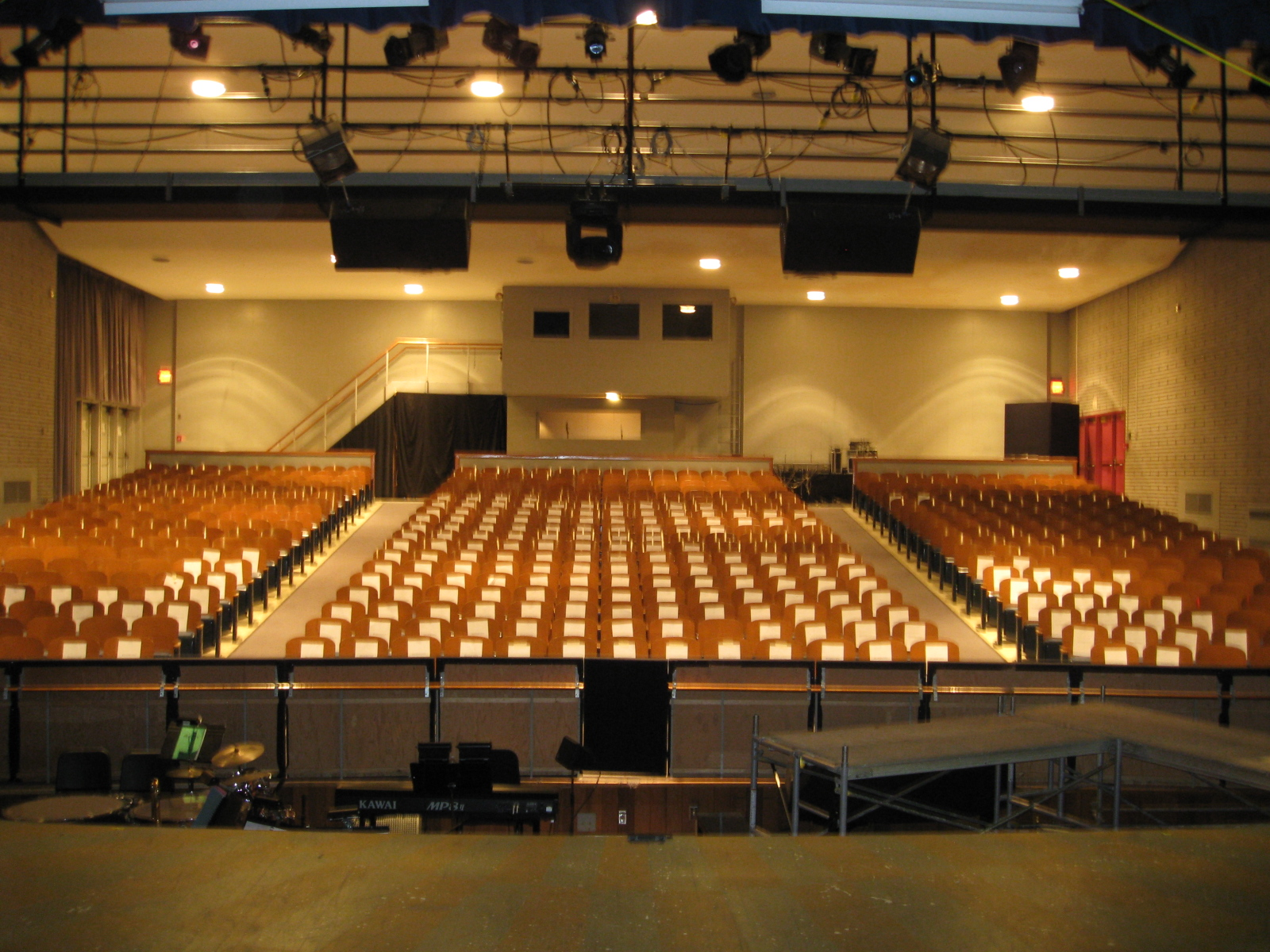
The Nancy Main Auditorium.

ESA, being housed in the former Royal York C.I. building, is equipped for both arts and academic programs. In addition to classroom facilities for the academic subjects, ESA has many spaces especially designed for the study of the arts. The Drama Department has four rooms which are used for classes and rehearsal space, as well as a 70-seat Thrust-style studio theatre. Visual Arts has a printmaking studio, a photography room and four studios for drawing, painting and sculpture as well as wall space for exhibitions. Two large, dance studios with bars and mirrored walls serve the Dance Department. The Music and Musical Theatre Departments share spaces that include a listening lab, an electronic piano lab, small practice rooms and three separate rooms for vocal, string and wind instruction. The film department has a wide variety of equipment and is currently developing green screening rooms.

ESA's Nancy Main Auditorium, which is named after the founding principal, is a 571-seat proscenium arch style theatre that serves as the primary performing venue. The Nancy Main is updated regularly and provides students with performing opportunities and the chance to learn about technical production. ESA has on staff a professional theatre technician who oversees all productions at the school.

The original building built for Royal York Collegiate Institute was designed by architect, Gordon Adamson, whose instrumental in designing post-war modern high schools in Etobicoke.

== Criticism ==
In June 2015, ESA student and graduate Alexi Halket was sent to the principal's office following an incident when she wore a black crop top that resembled a bra. In outrage, students across 25 TDSB schools including ESA and universities staged a protest in solidarity.

Former school principal Peggy Aitchison, was transferred to another TDSB school in 2018, following allegations of racial profiling after many students and parents became outraged after seeing the list — which many now call the "black list" — that Aitchison used the school's yearbook to identify black students.

== See also ==
- Education in Ontario
- List of secondary schools in Ontario
