= Melammu Project =

Research project on the ancient Near East

The logo of the Melammu Project (drawn by Rita Berg from a Greco-Persian style seal found on the northeastern shore of the Black Sea (Dominique Collon, First Impressions: Cylinder seals in the Ancient Near East (London: British Museum Publications), no. 432)).

The Melammu Project investigates the continuity, transformation and diffusion of Mesopotamian and Ancient Near Eastern culture from the third millennium BCE through the ancient world until Islamic times. It does so by organizing conferences and by providing resources relevant to the project on its website.

== History, purpose and organization ==
The Melammu Project was founded during its first conference in Helsinki, Finland, in 1998, as an offshoot of the Neo-Assyrian Text Corpus Project. Its purpose is to investigate the continuity, transformation and diffusion of Mesopotamian and Ancient Near Eastern culture from the third millennium BCE through the ancient world until Islamic times. It has two main activities: to organize conferences, and to provide resources relevant to the project on its website.

Melammu Symposia are held regularly and serve to promote interdisciplinary research and cross-cultural studies by providing a forum in which cultural continuity, diffusion and transformation in the ancient world can be assessed systematically on a long-term basis. The emphasis is on continued interchange of ideas between specialists in different disciplines, with the goal of gradually but steadily increasing the number of participants and thus breaking down the walls separating the individual disciplines. Although each symposium focuses on a different theme, since the primary purpose of the symposia is to encourage interdisciplinary cooperation per se, papers and posters not necessarily related to a specific theme but contributing to the overall scope of the project are welcome at every meeting.

The online resources provided by the Melammu Project include a database, a bibliography, a PDF library, and links to websites relevant to the project's focus. The database aims to collect textual, art-historical, archaeological, ethnographic and linguistic evidence concerning the heritage of Mesopotamia and the Ancient Near East and to make it easily accessible on the Internet. As the Melammu Project is envisioned as a 'community project', all resources are open-ended, which means that it is possible to submit information to enlarge and improve the database, bibliographies and lists of links through the website's submission forms.

The project is governed by a board, which consists of scholars from a wide variety of disciplines related to the project's focus. The main function of the board members is to promote the project and its meetings in the academic community and to safeguard the continuity of the project. For that reason, although the exact board size can vary, the board always consists of equally sized groups of senior and junior scholars (loosely defined). These include the organizers of the next two meetings (if known), as well as scholars involved in the database. The board is always elected for two years at one of the Melammu Symposia; the last election took place in 2013, at Melammu Symposia 7. The board currently consists of eighteen members, and is chaired by Robert Rollinger.

== Melammu Database ==
The Melammu Database contains documented links between the civilizations of Ancient Mesopotamia (Assyria, Babylonia and Sumer) and contemporary and later civilizations that show the impact and continuity of religion, political systems, art and iconography, literature, and other cultural and social phenomena as a result of both direct influence and of cultural diffusion.

There are two principal types of entries in the database. The first consists of citation from ancient texts. These entries are primary sources and consist of the ancient author's comments. Such entries have a "source" line which points to the ancient text and the Text-field contains a translation of the ancient source. There may be bibliographical citations as well if the passage has been discussed or commented on by other scholars. Wherever possible, there will be a hypertext link to the actual text of the ancient source.

The second type of entry consists of modern comparisons between features or phenomena in the ancient world that may show the effects of cultural contact or cultural diffusion. Entries of this type generally have a "bibliography" line that points to the scholarly assessment of this connection rather than a "source" line. However, if ancient sources are important for this connection, there may be a "source" line as well, sometimes including longer quotations, as in the first type. The Text-field will contain an outline of the argument connecting the features or phenomena.

== Name and logo ==
The name Melammu and its logo were chosen to illustrate essential aspects of the cross-cultural processes that the Project investigates. The word melammu, which means "divine radiance, splendour, nimbus, aura," is an Akkadian loanword from Sumerian. It thus concretely attests to the transfer and continuity of a centrally important doctrinal concept from an ideological system to a later one. In Mesopotamia alone, this concept has a documented continuity of over 4500 years, from the earliest cuneiform religious and historical documents (ca. 2600 BC) until the present day. The iconography of the concept has gone a long way from the radiance surrounding Mesopotamian gods to the halos surrounding the heads of Byzantine angels and saints and the loops hovering over the heads of Christian angels, but the concept itself has survived amazingly well and spread far beyond its original home.

The spread of the concept of "divine radiance" can be traced by observing the diffusion and transformations of the relevant iconographic motif. The logo of Melammu is taken from an Achaemenid seal discovered on the northeast coast of the Black Sea and represents the goddess Anahita, mounted on a lion and surrounded by the divine radiance, appearing to a Persian king. The details of the king's and the goddess's dress and crown are Persian, but in all other respects the seal is a faithful reproduction of centuries older Assyrian seals depicting appearances of the goddess Ishtar to members of the imperial ruling class. It thus illustrates not only the adoption of the Mesopotamian concept of "divine radiance" by the Persians, but also the assimilation of an important Iranian deity to a Mesopotamian one with the concomitant adoption of a whole system of religious beliefs, cultic practices, ideological doctrines, and artistic conventions. The fact that the seal was found outside the area controlled by the Assyrian Empire and possibly carved by a Greek artist, illustrates the dynamic diffusion of these ideas (through imperial propaganda) across geographical and cultural boundaries.

The radiance emitted by the goddess symbolizes to the Project the powerful impact of Mesopotamian culture on the surrounding world and later cultures, while the king symbolizes the crucial role of imperial courts in the preservation, transformation and diffusion of this cultural heritage.

== Melammu Symposia ==
So far, the following symposia have taken place:

- Melammu Symposia 1: The Heirs of Assyria. Tvärminne, Finland, October 8–11, 1998.
- Melammu Symposia 2: Mythology and Mythologies. Paris, France, October 4–7, 1999.
- Melammu Symposia 3: Ideologies as Cultural Phenomena. Chicago, USA, October 27–31, 2000.
- Melammu Symposia 4: Schools of Oriental Studies and the Development of Modern Historiography. Ravenna, Italy, October 13–17, 2001.
- Melammu Symposia 5: Commerce and Monetary Systems in the Ancient World. Innsbruck, Austria, October 3–8, 2002.
- Melammu Symposia 6: Globalisation in the First Millennium. Sofia, Bulgaria, September 1–3, 2008.
- Melammu Symposia 7: Mesopotamia in the Ancient World: Impact, Continuities, Parallels. Obergurgl, Austria, November 4–8, 2013.
- Melammu Symposia 8: The Iranian World. Kiel, Germany, November 11–15, 2014.
- Melammu Symposia 9: Conceptualizing Past, Present and Future. Helsinki, Finland and Tartu, Estonia, May 18–22, 2015.
- Melammu Symposia 10: Societies at War. Kassel, Germany, September 26–28, 2016.
- Melammu Symposia 11: Evidence Combined: Western and Eastern Sources in Dialogue. Held in Beirut, Lebanon, 2017.

== Proceedings of the Melammu Symposia ==
- Sanna Aro and R. M. Whiting (edd.). "The Heirs of Assyria". Melammu Symposia 1. Helsinki: The Neo-Assyrian Text Corpus Project 2000. (ISBN 951-45-9043-0)
- R.M. Whiting (ed.). "Mythology and Mythologies. Methodological approaches to intercultural influences". Melammu Symposia 2. Helsinki: The Neo-Assyrian Text Corpus Project 2001. (ISBN 951-45-9049-X)
- A. Panaino and G. Pettinato (edd.). "Ideologies as Intercultural Phenomena". Melammu Symposia 3. Milan: Universita di Bologna & IsIAO 2002. (ISBN 88-8483-107-5)
- A. Panaino and A. Piras (edd.). "Schools of Oriental Studies and the Development of Modern Historiography". Melammu Symposia 4. Milan: Università di Bologna & IsIao 2004. (ISBN 88-8483-206-3)
- Robert Rollinger, Christoph Ulf and Kordula Schnegg (edd.). "Commerce and Monetary Systems in the Ancient World. Means of Transmission and Cultural Interaction". Melammu Symposia 5. Stuttgart: Franz Steiner Verlag 2004. (ISBN 3-515-08379-0)

== The International Association for Intercultural Studies of the Melammu Project (2001-2013) ==
At the Third Annual Symposium of the Assyrian and Babylonian Intellectual Heritage Project (Chicago, USA, October 27–31, 2000), the general assembly deliberated the foundation of an "International Association for Intercultural Studies of the Melammu Project", to be officially established through legal channels. However, during the general discussion at the end of the Melammu Symposia 7 (2013), it was decided by majority vote to absolve the association. The argument for doing so was that the association had never developed or functioned beyond its initial creation.

== See also ==
- Assyrian continuity
- Hyperdiffusionism in archaeology
