= Matthew Varey =

Canadian artist and educator (born 1968)

Matthew Varey (born 1968 in Hamilton, Ontario) is a Canadian artist and educator. He was educated at McMaster University (BFA, 1992) and D'Youville College (Ed.Cert., 2004). He lives and works in Toronto and is currently the Head of Contemporary Art at Etobicoke School of the Arts. In 2016 he was awarded the Canadian Society for Education through Arts' 'Canadian Art Educator of the Year Award (Grades 9–12)'.

== Career ==
In 1991, Varey served as the director of the Carnegie Gallery in Hamilton, Ontario while concurrently maintaining an active studio practise upon graduation from McMaster University in 1992. Varey exhibited widely in southern Ontario from 1988, before showing internationally for the first time in 1995 at the International Arts Center in Hiroshima, Japan. During his career as an artist, Varey has exhibited around the world at Mati Gallery in Greece, Art Forum Berlin in Germany, Art Miami in the United States, and at Fondazione Bevilacqua La Masa in Italy.

In 2004, Varey started teaching Visual Art at Etobicoke School of the Arts, and was shortly thereafter appointed as Head of Visual Art in 2007. He remains in this position and has restructured the program into the new 'Contemporary Art Department', refocusing the curricular focus onto bringing contemporary studio-based practise into the classroom.

He is currently Head of Contemporary at Etobicoke School of the Arts and an active artist.

== Public and corporate collections (selected) ==
- Art Gallery of Hamilton, Hamilton, Ontario
- The McMaster Museum of Art, Hamilton, Canada
- Cenovus Energy, Calgary, Canada
- The Donovan Collection, Toronto, Canada
- Bell Canada, Toronto, Canada
- Sunnybrook Hospital, Toronto, Canada
- Wilfrid Laurier University, Waterloo, Canada
- Vancouver Stock Exchange, Vancouver, Canada
- McCullough, O’Connor, Irwin, Vancouver, Canada
- The Tragically Hip, Kingston, Ontario
- Estate of Farley Mowat, Port Hope, Ontario
