= Qalat-i Dinka =

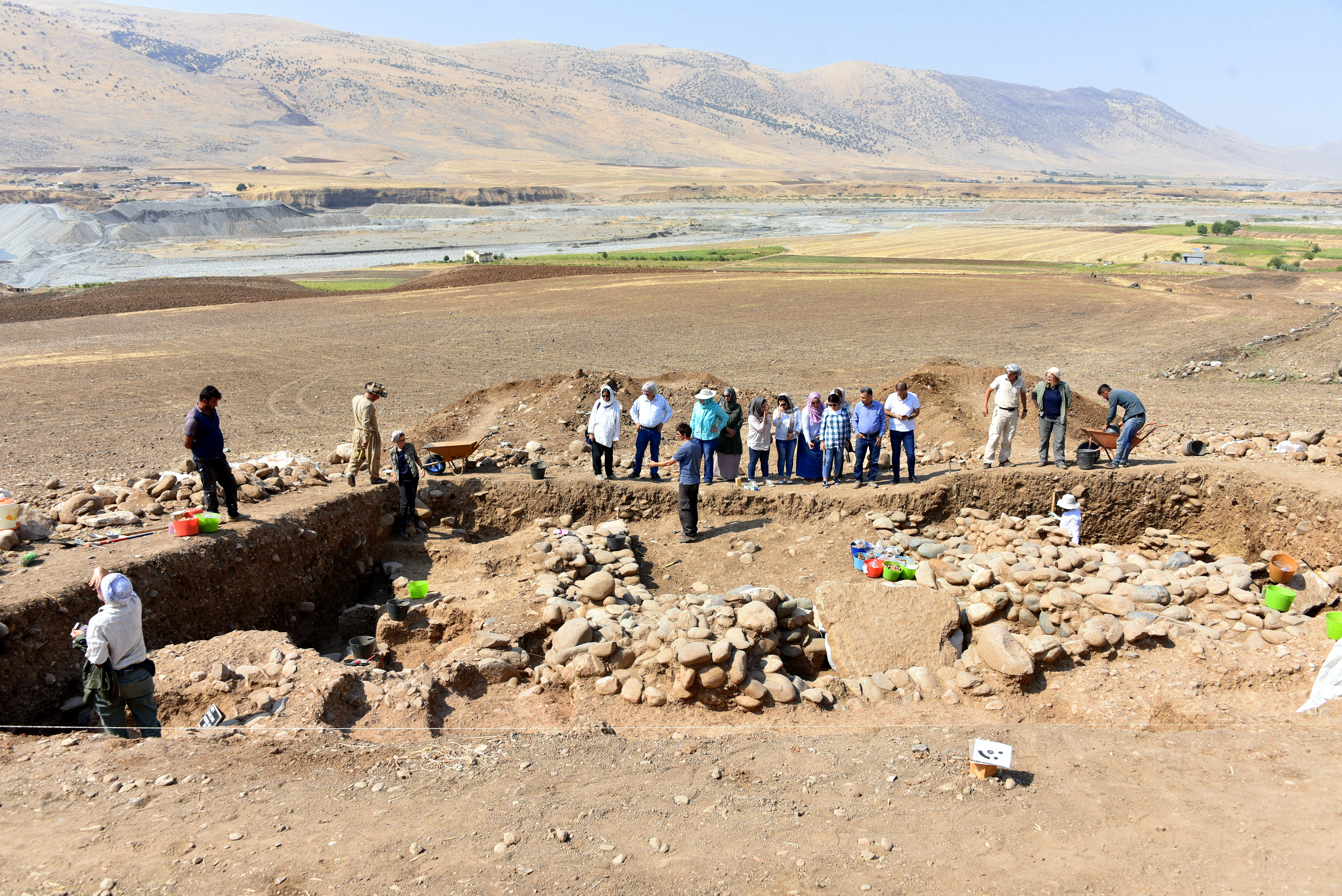
- Exacavations at Qalat-i Dinka, September 26, 2019

- Location within Near East Location within Iraq
- 36°8′13″N 45°7′57″E
- Type: Settlement
- Location: Little Zab, Sulaymaniyah Governorate, Iraq
- Region: Mesopotamia

Qalat-i Dinka is an archaeological excavation site in Iraq, which is located on the Little Zab, in the Sulaymaniyah Governorate, in the very north-east of the country. Excavations have been taking place there since 2016 after a fragment of a cuneiform tablet came to light by chance. The excavation results are available annually in preliminary reports and excavation publications.

Qalat-i Dink is mainly the remains of a Neo-Assyrian city that took up about 60 hectares. The ancient name of the city is unknown. Modern robbery excavations have often disrupted the archaeological layers, which makes exploring the ruins more difficult. Earlier remains dating back to the Copper Age have also been found in various places in the city. A furnace from this time was completely uncovered.

The size of the city and its structure are relatively well known due to magnometric surveys. The ruins are spread over a hill, which the excavators call the citadel, and the city proper to the north, known as the lower city. Small areas have been excavated in various places in the city. The residential buildings are made of rubble, but so far no house has been completely exposed. One building that may have belonged to a wealthy citizen of the city had a large hall, the floor of which is paved with bricks. Three phases could be distinguished. Remains of a wall were found below the house, suggesting older buildings. This was followed by the phase in which the house was built, and there are later graves that are spread over the excavation area. The graves mainly contained jewelry as gifts, but there was also a well-preserved bronze bowl.

The finds in the city proper include mainly ceramics. But there were also cylinder seals that stylistically dated to the first half of the first millennium BC. To date. In addition, numerous iron arrowheads and fever came to light.

Graves from the Sassanid period have also been found. They usually only contained a few jewelry gifts. These were mainly stone and glass beads.

== Gallery ==
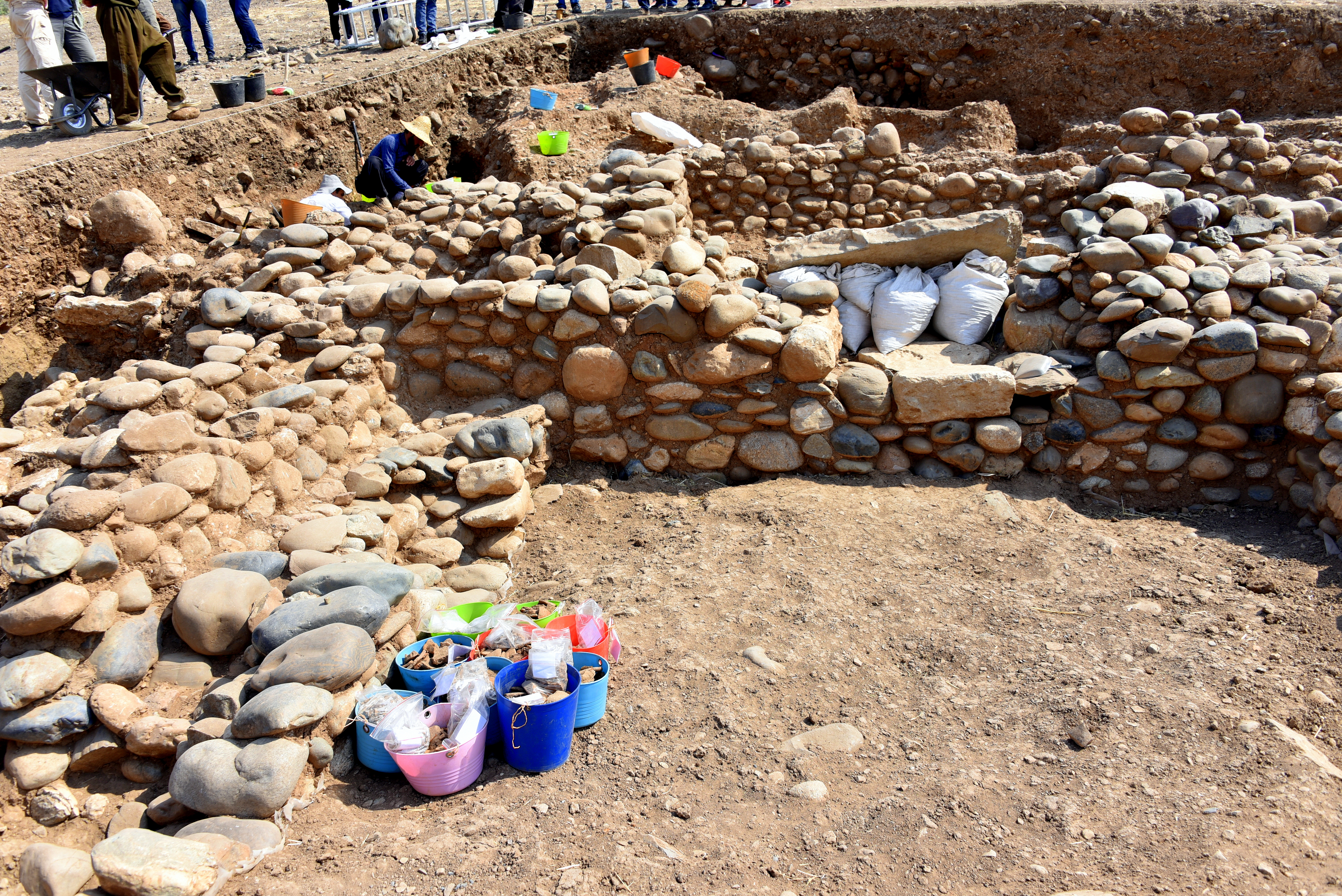
Room 58 appears. Some of the excavated findings were put in buckets

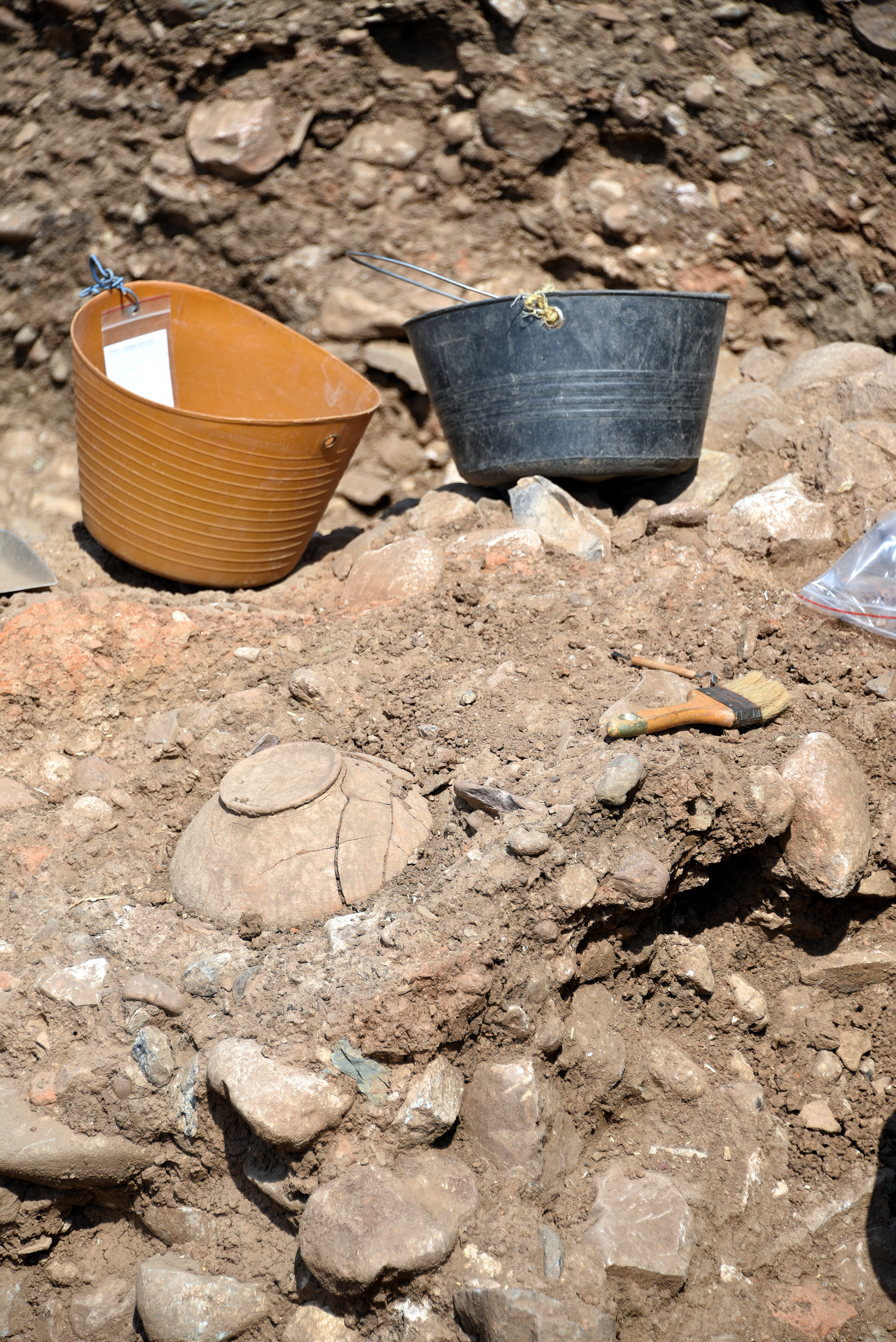
Grave 109 is shown

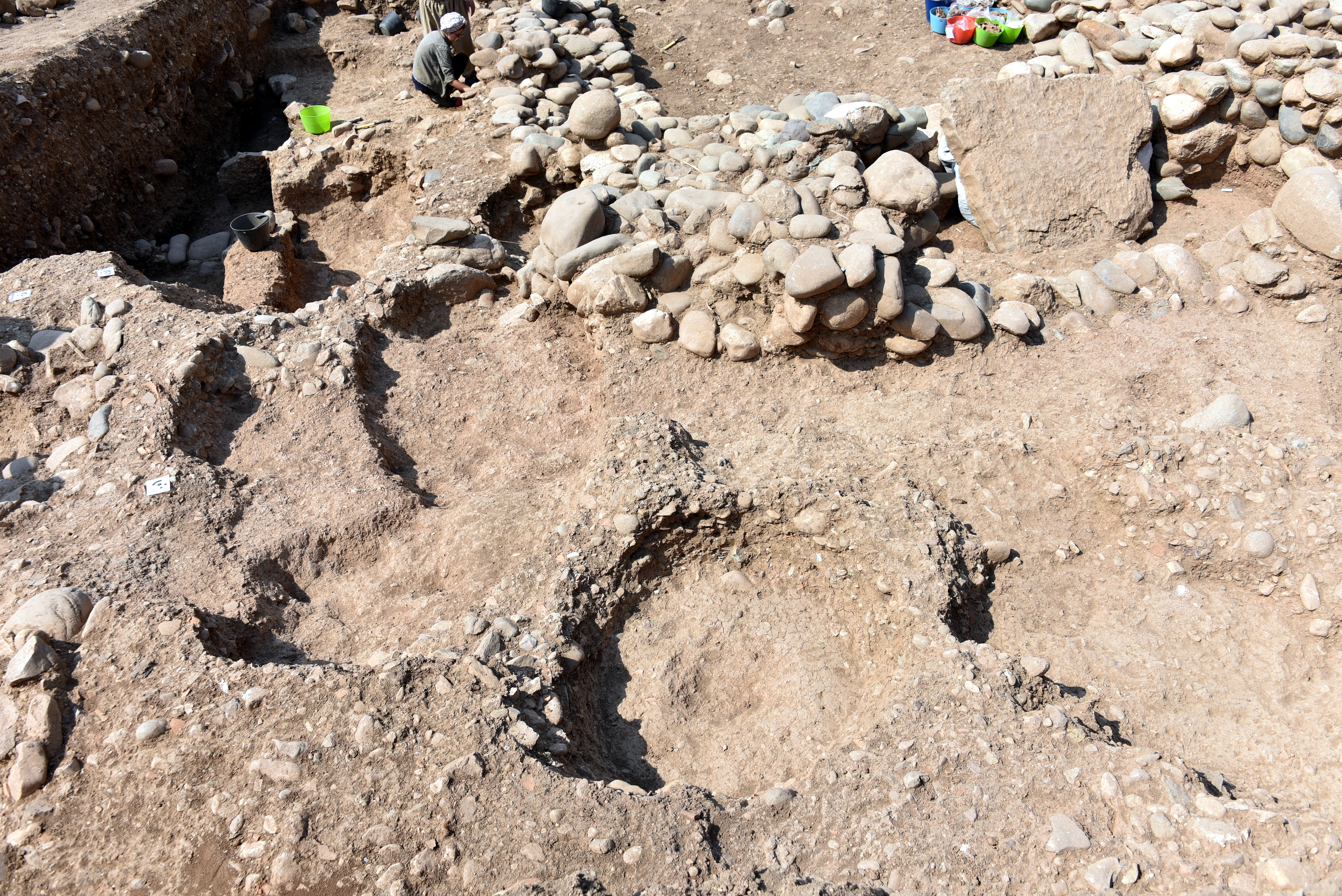
Part of the surface of one of the adjacent outdoors. The area has been punctuated by modern looters' pits.

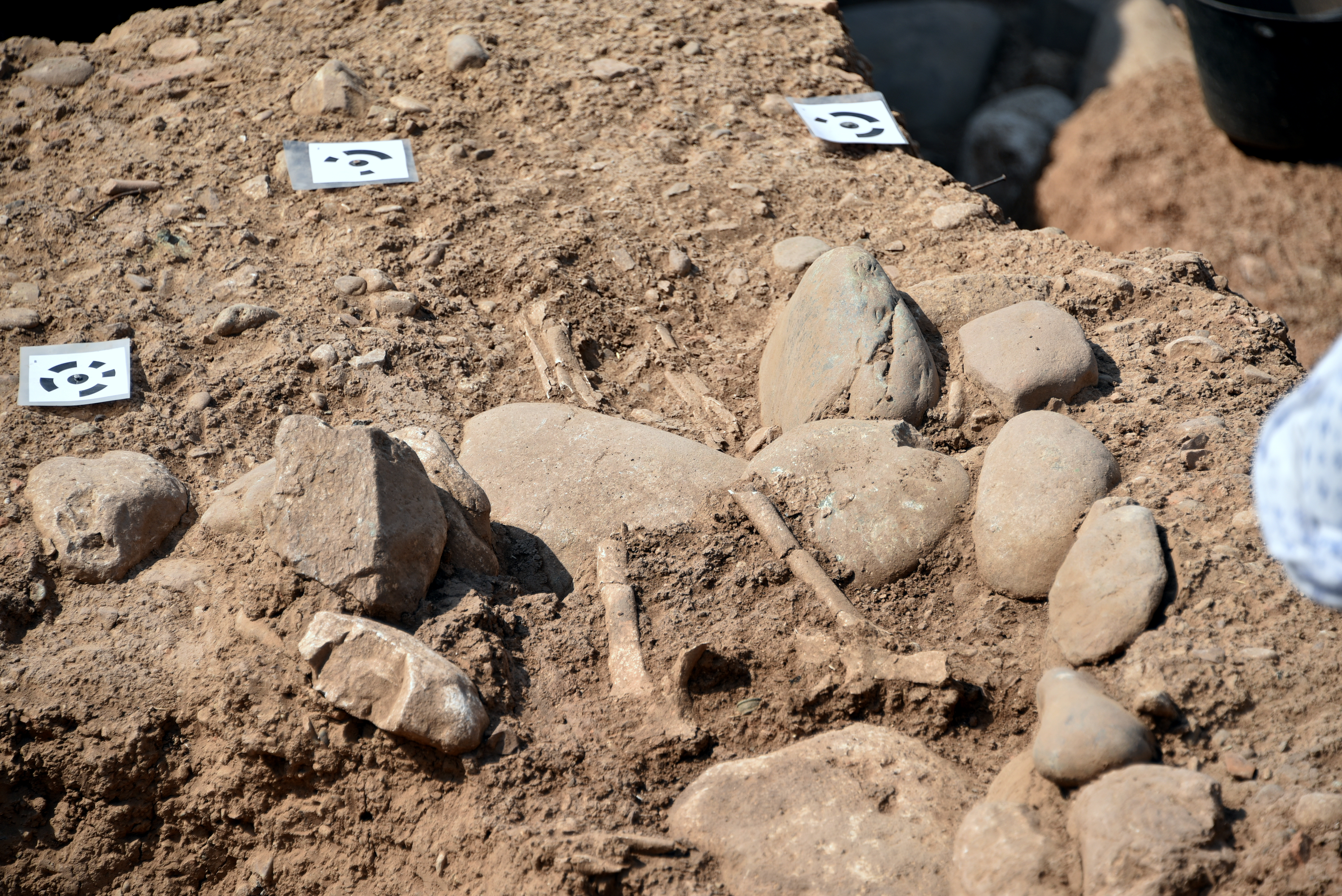
Part of a skeleton appears. Grave 103
