= Neo-Assyrian Text Corpus Project =

Scholarly project based in Finland

The Neo-Assyrian Text Corpus Project is an international scholarly project aimed at collecting and publishing ancient Assyrian texts of the Neo-Assyrian Empire and studies based on them. Its headquarters are in Helsinki in Finland.

== State Archives of Assyria ==
The following works are published in the State Archives of Assyria series:
Volume	Title	Author	Year
I	The Correspondence of Sargon II, Part 1: Letters from Assyria and the West	Simo Parpola	1987
II	Neo-Assyrian Treaties and Loyalty Oaths	Simo Parpola and Kazuko Watanabe	1988
III	Court Poetry and Literary Miscellanea	Alasdair Livingstone	1989
IV	Queries to the Sungod: Divination and Politics in Sargonid Assyria	I. Starr	1990
V	The Correspondence of Sargon II, Part II: Letters from the Northern and Northeastern Provinces	G. B. Lanfranchi and Simo Parpola	1990
VI	Legal Transactions of the Royal Court of Nineveh, Part 1: Tiglath-Pileser III through Esarhaddon	T. Kwasman and S. Parpola	1991
VII	Imperial Administrative Records, part 1: Palace and Temple Administration	Frederick M. Fales and J. N. Postgate	1992
VIII	Astrological Reports to Assyrian Kings	H. Hunger	1992
IX	Assyrian Prophecies	S. Parpola	1997
X	Letters from Assyrian and Babylonian Scholars	Simo Parpola	1993
XI	Imperial Administrative Records, Part 2: Provincial and Military Administration	F. M. Fales and J. N. Postgate	1995
XII	Grants, Decrees and Gifts of the Neo-Assyrian Period	L. Kataja and R. Whiting	1995
XIII	Letters from Assyrian and Babylonian Priests to Kings Esarhaddon and Assurbanipal	S. W. Cole and P. Machinist	1998
XIV	Legal Transactions of the Royal Court of Nineveh, Part 2: Assurbanipal Through Sin-šarru-iškun	R. Mattila	2002
XV	The Correspondence of Sargon II, Part III: Letters from Babylonia and the Eastern Provinces	A. Fuchs and S. Parpola	2001
XVI	The Political Correspondence of Esarhaddon	M. Luukko and G. Van Buylaere	2002
XVII	The Neo-Babylonian Correspondence of Sargon and Sennacherib	M. Dietrich	2003
XVIII	The Babylonian Correspondence of Esarhaddon and Letters to Assurbanipal and Sin-šarru-iškun from Northern and Central Babylonia	F. S. Reynolds	2003
XIX	The Correspondence of Tiglath-Pileser III and Sargon II	M. Luukko	2012
XX	Assyrian Royal Rituals and Cultic Texts	Simo Parpola	2017
XXI	The Correspondence of Assurbanipal, Part I: Letters from Assyria, Babylonia, and Vassal States	Simo Parpola	2018
XXII	The Correspondence of Assurbanipal, Part II: Letters from Southern Babylonia	Grant Frame and Simo Parpola	2023
XXIII	Supplement to SAA I–XXII: Letters, Treaties, Literary Texts, Legal and Administrative Documents, Astronomical Reports, Oracle Queries, and Rituals	Mikko Luukko and Greta van Buylaere	2024

== State Archives of Assyria Cuneiform Texts ==
The following works are published in the State Archives of Assyria Cuneiform Texts series:
Volume Number	Title	Author	Year
I	The Standard Babylonian Epic of Gilgamesh	Simo Parpola	1997
II	The Standard Babylonian Etana Epic	Jamie R. Novotny	2001
III	The Standard Babylonian Epic of Anzû	Amar Annus	2001
IV	The Standard Babylonian Creation Myth Enūma Eliš	Philippe Talon	2005
V	Evil Demons: Canonical Utukkū Lemnūtu/Udug Incantations	M.J. Geller	2007
VI	The Neo-Assyrian Myth of Ištar Descent and Resurrection	Pirjo Lapinkivi	2010
VII	Ludlul bēl Nēmeqi	Amar Annus and Alan Lenzi	2010
VIII	The Standard Babylonian Myth of Nergal and Ereškigal	M. Luukko and Simonetta Ponchia	2013
IX	The Babylonian Theodicy	Takayoshi Oshima	2013
X	Selected Royal Inscriptions of Assurbanipal	Jamie R. Novotny	2014
XI	The Anti-Witchcraft Series Maqlû	Tzvi Abusch	2015
XII	The Tale of the Poor Man of Nippur	Baruch Ottervanger	2016

== State Archives of Assyria Studies ==
The following works are published in the: State Archives of Assyria Studies series:
Voilume	Title	Author	Year
I	Neuassyrische Glyptik des 8.-7.Jh. v. Chr. unter besonderer Berūcksichtigung der Siegelungen auf Tafeln und Tonverschlŭsse	Suzanne Herbordt	1992
II	The Eponyms of the Assyrian Empire 910–612 BC	Alan Millard	1994
III	The Use of Numbers and Quantifications in the Assyrian Royal Inscriptions	Marco De Odorico	1995
IV	Nippur in Late Assyrian Times c. 755–612 BC	Steven W. Cole	1996
V	Neo-Assyrian Judicial Procedures	Remko Jas	1996
VI	Die neuassyrischen Privatrechtsurkunden als Quelle fŭr Mensch und Umwelt	Karen Radner	1997
VII	References to Prophecy in Neo-Assyrian Sources	Martti Nissinen	1998
VIII	Die Annalen des Jahres 711 v. Chr. nach Prismenfragmenten aus Nineve und Assur	Andreas Fuchs	1998
IX	The Role of Naqia/Zakutu in Sargonid Politics	Sarah C. Melville	1999
X	Herrschaftswissen in Mesopotamien: Formen der Kommunikation zwischen Gott und Kǒnig im 2. und 1. Jahrtausend v. Chr	Beate Pongratz-Leisten	1999
XI	The King's Magnates; A Study of the Highest Officials of the Neo-Assyrian Empire	Raija Mattila	2000
XII	A Survey of Neo-Elamite History	Matthew W. Waters	2000
XIII	A Sketch of Neo-Assyrian Grammar	Jaakko Hämeen-Anttila	2000
XIV	The God Ninurta in the Mythology and Royal Ideology of Ancient Mesopotamia	Amar Annus	2002
XV	The Sumerian Sacred Marriage in the Light of Comparative Evidence	Pirjo Lapinkivi	2004
XVI	Grammatical Variation in Neo-Assyrian	M. Luukko	2004
XVII	La Magie neo-assyrienne en Contexte: Recherches sur le métier d’exorciste et le concept d’ashiputu	Cynthia Jean	2006
XVIII	Voyages et Voyageurs à l'Époque Néo-Assyrienne	Sabrina Favaro	2007
XIX	Secrecy and the Gods: Secret Knowledge in Ancient Mesopotamia and Biblical Israel	Alan Lenzi	2008
XX	The Scourge of God: The Umman-manda and Its Significance in the First Millennium BC	Selim Adali	2011
XXI	Beyond Hearth and Home: Women in the Public Sphere in Neo-Assyrian Society	Sherry MacGregor	2012
XXII	The Babylonian Astrolabe: The Calendar of Creation	Rumen Kolev	2013
XXIII	Women and Power in Neo-Assyrian Palaces	Saana Svärd	2015
XXIV	The Overturned Boat: Intertextuality of the Adapa Myth and Exorcist Literature	Amar Annus	20116
XXV	Die assyrischen Königstitel und –epitheta	Vladimir Sazonov	2016
XXVI	Alterity in Ancient Assyrian Propaganda	Mattias Karlsson	2017
XXVII	Mythopoeïa: ou l’art de forger les « mythes » dans l’« aire culturelle » syro-mésopotamienne, méditerranéenne et indo-européenne	Jérôme Pace	2019
XXVIII	Neo-Assyrian Sources in Context: Thematic Studies of Texts, History, and Culture	Shigeo Yamada	2019
XXIX	Writing Neo-Assyrian History: Sources, Problems, and Approaches	Giovanni Battista Lanfranchi, Raija Mattila, and Robert Rollinger (eds)	2019
XXX	Untersuchungen Zur Transtextuellen Poetik: Assyrischer Herrschaftlich-Narrativen Texte	Johannes Bach	2020
XXXI	From the Nile to the Tigris: African Individuals and Groups in Texts from the Neo-Assyrian Empire	Mattias Karlsson	2022
XXXII	Aramaic Loanwords in Neo-Assyrian 911–612 B.C.	Zack Cherry	2023
XXXIII	The Queens of the Arabs During the Neo-Assyrian Period	Ellie Bennett	2024
XXXIV	Royal Image and Political Thinking in the Letters of Assurbanipal	Sanae Ito	2024

== State Archives of Assyria Literary Texts ==
The following works are published in the State Archives of Assyria Literary Texts series:
Volume	Title	Author	Year
I	The Induction of the Cult Image in Ancient Mesopotamia: The Mesopotamian Mis Pî Ritual	Christopher Walker and Michael Dick	2001

== See also ==
- Epic of Gilgamesh
- Text corpus
