= Ura =

Ura may refer to:

== Government and politics ==
- United Red Army, a revolutionary group in Japan
- Uganda Revenue Authority
- United Reform Action, a party in Montenegro
- Urban Renewal Authority, in Hong Kong
- Urban Redevelopment Authority, in Singapore

== Places ==
=== Settlements ===
- Ura, Anatolia, a port in Anatolia during the Late Bronze Age and Iron Age
- Ura, Bhutan, a populated place in Bhutan
- Ura, Estonia, village in Koonga Parish, Pärnu County, Estonia
- Ura, Hungary, a village in the Northern Great Plain, Hungary
- Ura, Russia, several rural localities in Russia

=== Rivers ===
- Ura River, Estonia
- Ura (Lena), Russia, a Lena tributary
- Ura (Yula), Russia, a Yula tributary

== Languages ==
- Ura language (Papua New Guinea)
- Ura language (Vanuatu)
- Fungwa language, Nigeria

== Other uses ==
- Ura (dance), of the Cook Islands
- Ura, or uracil, a nucleobase of RNA
- Ura (Russian: Ура!), a Russian battle cry

== People ==
- Ura (surname), Japanese surname
- Ura Kazuki (宇良 和輝; born 1992), Japanese sumo wrestler
- Ura Rigana (born 1976), Papua New Guinean former woman cricketer

== See also ==
- URA (disambiguation)
