= Syennesis III =

Ancient Cilician ruler

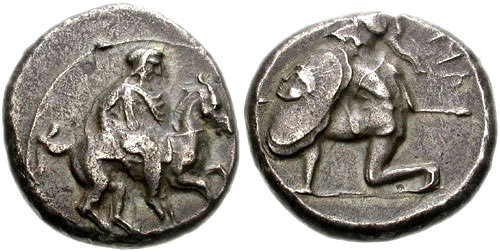
Coinage of Syennesis III. Circa 425-400 BC. Satrap on horseback galloping right / TRZ (𐡕𐡓𐡆) in Aramaic right, hoplite kneeling left, wearing crested Corinthian helmet, holding spear in right hand, large round shield decorated with gorgoneion in right.

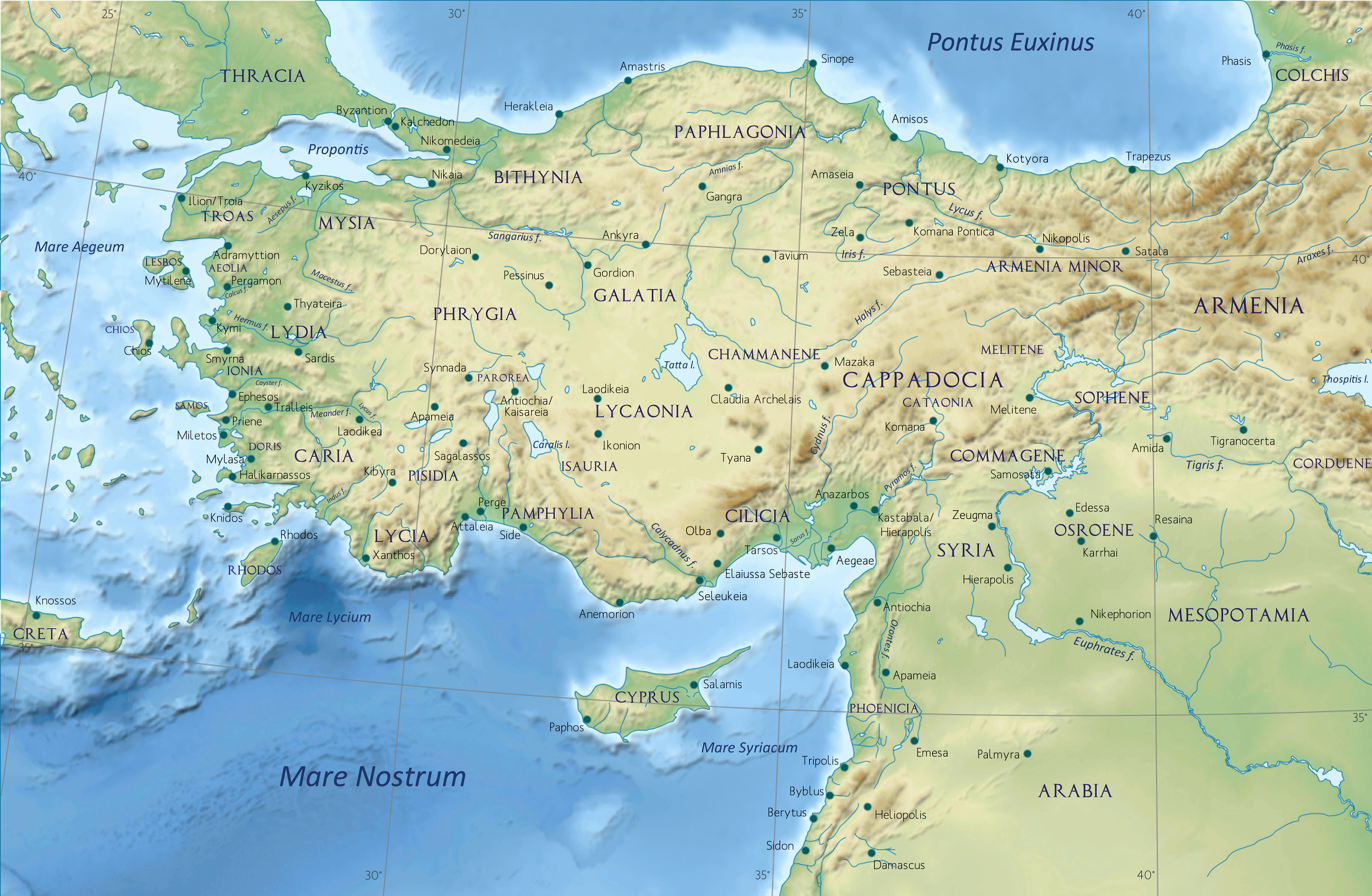
Location of Cilicia within the classical regions of Asia Minor/Anatolia

Syennesis III (Ancient Greek: Συέννεσις) was a ruler of ancient Cilicia in the 5th century BCE.

== Rule ==
Syennesis was a contemporary of Artaxerxes II of Persia, and when Cyrus the Younger, marching against Artaxerxes in 401 BCE, arrived at the borders of Cilicia, he found the passes guarded by Syennesis, who, however, withdrew his troops on receiving intelligence that the force advanced by Cyrus under Meno had already entered Cilicia, and that the combined fleet of the Lacedaemonians and the prince, under Samius and Tamos, was sailing round from Ionia.

When Cyrus reached Tarsus, the Cilician capital, he found that Meno's soldiers had sacked the city, and commanded Syennesis to appear before him. Syennesis had fled for refuge to a stronghold among the mountains, but he was induced by his wife, Epyaxa, to obey the summons of Cyrus. Here he received gifts of honor from Cyrus, whom he supplied in his turn with a large sum of money and a considerable body of troops under the command of one of his sons.

At the same time, however, Syennesis took care to send his other son to Artaxerxes, to represent his meeting with Cyrus as having been something he'd been forced to do, while his heart all the time was with the king, Artaxerxes. From Xenophon's telling it appears that Syennesis at this time, though really a vassal of Persia, affected the tone of an independent sovereign.

== Coinage ==
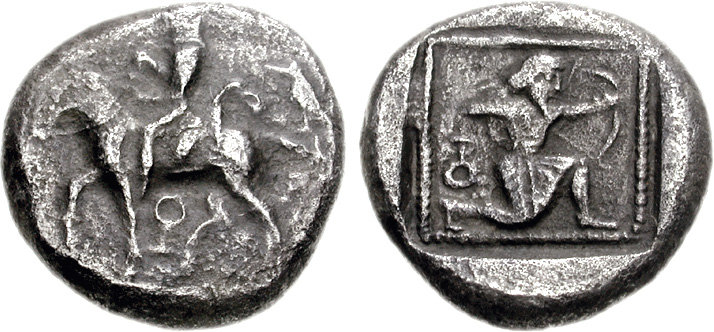
Possible coin of Syennesis, Tarsos. Circa 425-400 BC. Satrap on horseback riding left; behind, eagle perched left on branch; monogram below / Archer in kneeling-running stance right, drawing bow; monogram behind.
