= Annals of Amenemhat II =

Historical document

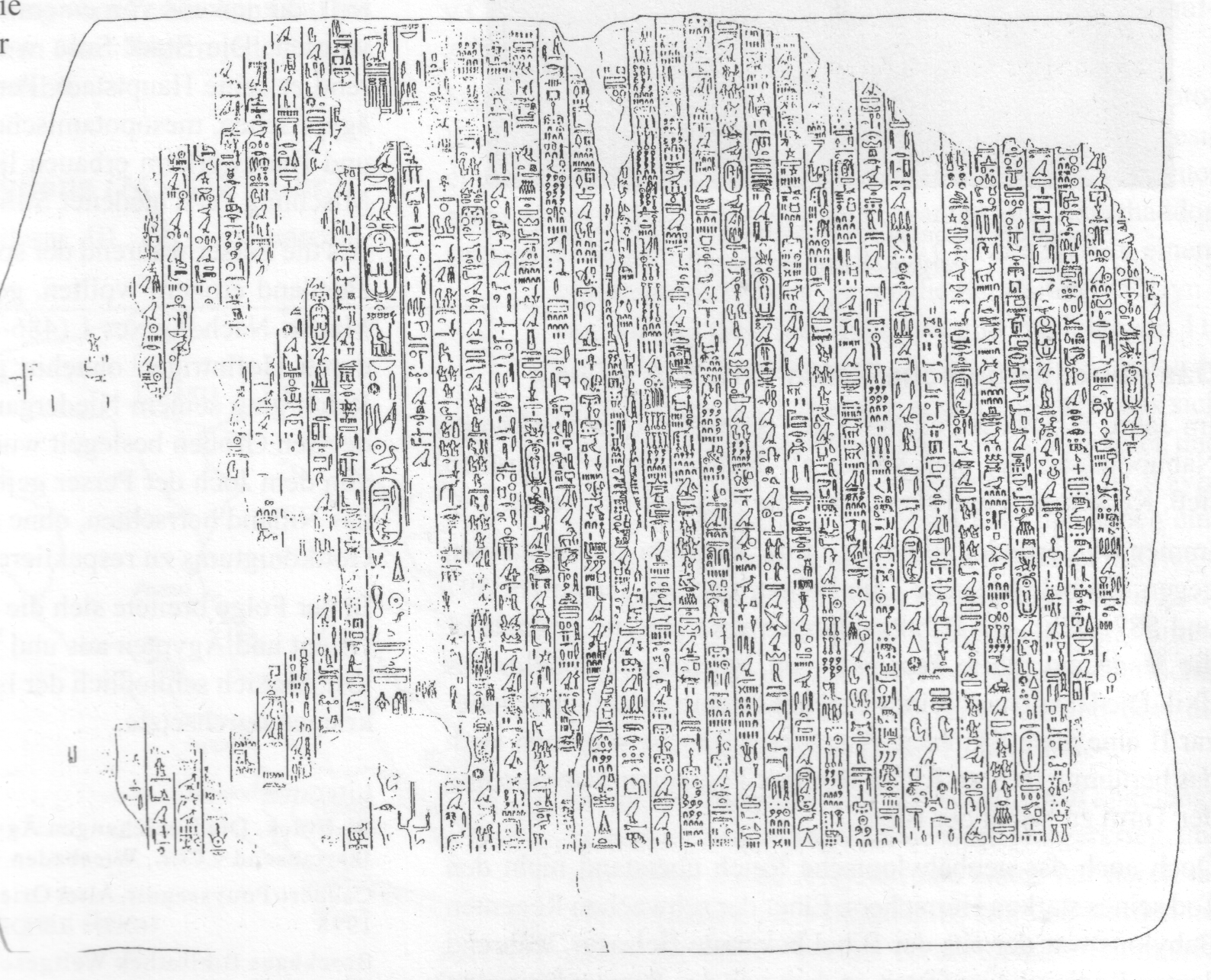
Drawing of the bigger fragment

Several fragments belonging to the Annals of Amenemhat II are known from Memphis in Egypt. They are an important historical document for the reign of the Ancient Egyptian king Amenemhat II (about 1929–1895 BC), but also for the history of Ancient Egypt and understanding kingship in general.

== Discovery ==
The first fragment of these annals was found in 1908 at Memphis, by excavations under Flinders Petrie. The fragment was published in 1909. A second and much bigger fragment was discovered by Gerhard Haeny and raised in 1974 by Sami Farag, who was at this time director for Egyptian antiquities in Memphis and Saqqara. It was found under the base of a colossal statue of king Ramses II and was used there as supporting stone. The latter fragment is 188 cm (74 in) high, 259 cm (102 in) wide and about 48 cm (19 in) thick.

The fragment contains the remains of 41 columns describing events in the reign of king Amenemhat II. A high number of these events are reports of offerings made to different deities and temples all around the country.

== Foreign relations ==
There are also accounts of military enterprises. In column 7 there is mentioned the sending of a mission to the Lebanon region. In the following column there is a report of another mission to Asia for destroying Iuaa.

In column 9/10 appears a report of the coming of people from Kush (Nubia) and Ubatsepet. The latter place is otherwise only rarely attested but might be south of Nubia. The people brought tributes, such as plants, incense, gold, weapons, but also head rests and even wigs.

In column 12 is mentioned the coming of the children of the ruler from Asia. They bring tributes to Egypt. Children of the ruler does not necessarily mean that the actual children of the local ruler came, but in a wider context, can signify the people of a ruler. Column 18 reports the destruction of the Asian towns Iuai and Iasy and the bringing of 1554 prisoners to Egypt. Then, in column 25 is mentioned that the prisoners were placed in the pyramid town Sekhem-Amenemhat (perhaps the name of Amenemhat II's pyramid town), most likely for building the White Pyramid.

== Expeditions to the Sinai ==
Column 13/14 reports the return of an expedition from the Sinai. The main material brought back was turquoise, but also other minerals (most of the Egyptian words in the text are not yet identified) and petrified wood. There are several expeditions to the Sinai known, that date under Amenemhat II. For several reasons it seems most likely that the text refers to the one datable to year 29 of the king, providing a rough timeframe for the events mentioned on this fragment of the stone.

In column 23 there is a report of the king being in Fayum for catching birds. This is almost the only time that the king appears in the text as the main person acting. The catching of birds has most likely a ritual function.

The dating of the annals within the reign of king Amenemhat II is uncertain. There is no year dating within the preserved texts. There are otherwise only a few indications. In column 10 appears the statue of the overseer of marshland dwellers Ameny. This person is also known from a rock inscription in Southern Egypt, dated to year 43 of Senusret I. On the fragment found by Petrie appears a statue of the vizier Ameny. Until year 8 of Amenemhat II, the vizier Senusret was in office. Therefore, this part of the inscription must relate to events after year 8, as the vizier Ameny must have been in office after year 8. On the other side there are events mentioned that might relate to the Sed festival of the king, that happened around year 30 of the king's reign.

It is not known where these annals were once placed. It seems possible that they once decorated the funerary temple of Amenemhat II at his pyramid at Dahshur.

== Foreign locations ==
In the text there are mentioned several foreign locations; many of them are not known from other sources and are therefore hard to identify. Hartwig Altenmüller who published a full study of the text follows Wolfgang Helck who identifies Iasy with Alasia (Cyprus) and Iuai with Ura in modern Turkey. If these identifications are correct they testify to Egyptian military enterprise much farther away than previously thought.

== Literature ==
- Hartwig Altenmüller and A. M. Moussa, "Die Inschrift Amenemhets II. aus dem Ptah-Tempel von Memphis, ein Vorbericht," Studien zur Altägyptischen Kultur 18 (1991): 1–48
- Ezra Marcus, "Amenemhet II and the Sea: Maritime Aspects of the Mit Rahina (Memphis) Inscription," Egypt and the Levant 17 (2007): 137–190
