= Ḫilakku =

𒆳𒄭𒋃𒆪 (Ḫilakku: earlier) 𒆳𒉿𒆸𒁺 (Pirindu: later)
- Unknown–401 BC
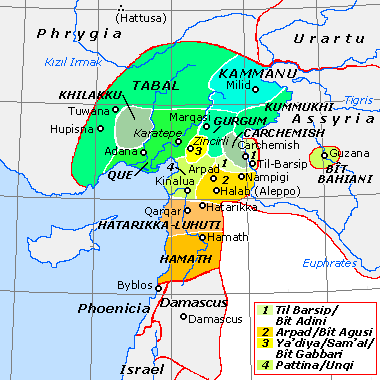
- Ḫilakku among the Neo-Hittite states

- Kingdom of Cilicia in 6th century BC
- Capital: Urā (earlier); Tarsus (later)
- Common languages: Luwian
- Religion: Luwian religion
- Government: Monarchy
- King
  - r. c. 858 BC: Piḫirim
  - r. c. 718 BC – 713 BC: Ambaris
  - r. c. 662 BC: Sandašarme
  - c. 585 BC: Syennesis I
  - r. c. 557 BC: Appuwašu
  - r. c. 480 BC: Syennesis II
  - r. c. 470s BC: Xeinagoras
  - r. c. 401 BC: Syennesis III
- Historical era: Iron Age
  - Established: Unknown
  - Submission to the Achaemenid Empire: c. 542 BC
  - Annexation by the Achaemenid Empire: 401 BC
| Preceded by | Succeeded by |
| Tarḫuntašša | Cilicia (satrapy) |
- Today part of: Turkey

Ḫilakku (Neo-Assyrian Akkadian: 𒆳𒄭𒋃𒆪), later known as Pirindu (Neo-Babylonian Akkadian: 𒆳𒉿𒆸𒁺 and 𒆳𒉿𒊑𒅔𒁺), was a Luwian-speaking Neo-Hittite state which existed in southeastern Anatolia in the Iron Age.

== Name ==
=== Ḫilakku ===
The native name of this kingdom is still unknown due to a lack of Hieroglyphic Luwian inscriptions from it during the Iron Age, although it has been tentatively identified with:

- the country of Ḫilika (𒌷𒄭𒇷𒅅𒋡) mentioned in the texts of the Hittite Empire;
- the land of Ḫilikka (𔗒𔔹𔗧𔔂) referred to in Melidian inscriptions;
- and the country of Ḫirikka (𔗒𔖱𔓯𔗧𔔂) mentioned in the records of Ḫalparuntiyas I of Gurgum.

Ḫilakku (𒆳𒄭𒋃𒆪) was the name given by Neo-Assyrian Akkadian sources to this kingdom, and the name of the region which in Graeco-Roman times was called Cilicia was derived from that of Ḫilakku.

=== Pirindu ===
Following the collapse of the Neo-Assyrian Empire, the country of Ḫilakku reappeared in Neo-Babylonian Akkadian sources under the name of Pirindu (𒆳𒉿𒆸𒁺 and 𒆳𒉿𒊑𒅔𒁺).

The name Pirindu was derived from a Luwian name *Piruwanda, meaning lit. 'stony (place)', corresponding to the later Greek and Turkish appelations of this region as Kilikia Trakheia (Κιλικία Τραχεῖα) and Taşeli, which have the same meanings.

It is uncertain whether the Neo-Babylonian name Pirindu is identical to the country of Pirundummeya (Hittite: 𒌷𒁉𒊒𒌦𒁺𒌝𒈨𒅀) mentioned in the records of the Hittite Empire as a source of gold.

== Geography ==
=== Location ===
The kingdom of Ḫilakku was located in the western section of the territory which later in Classical Antiquity became known as Cilicia, more specifically in the part which was referred to as Rough Cilicia (Ancient Greek: Κιλικία Τραχεῖα, romanized: Kilikía Trakheîa; Latin: Cilicia Aspera), in the region of the Taurus and Bolkar mountains to the north and north-west of Ḫiyawa, between it and the Tabalian region, thus corresponding to the northern and northeastern parts of Rough Cilicia in the region of the later Olba and alongside the lower Calycadnus river.

Ḫilakku's eastern boundary was located in the mountainous region between the southeastern Konya Plain and northern Tarsus, while its western border was the Calycadnus river, whose valley linked it to the Konya Plain.

By the Neo-Babylonian period, Pirindu was located in the western and southern parts of Rough Cilicia, and it had expanded to include the lands to the west of the Calycadnus river, where it reached Sallunê in the west and the Mediterranean sea in the south. To the east, Pirindu had expanded until the city of Ḫarrua in Plain Cilicia.

=== Neighbours ===
The neighbours of Ḫilakku were Ḫiyawa to its east and the kingdoms of the Tabalian region to its north, hence why Neo-Assyrian records associated Ḫilakku with Que (Ḫiyawa) and Tabal.

=== Cities ===
Neo-Assyrian sources recorded the existence of a city of Ḫilakku, although this cannot be taken as evidence for the kingdom being a city-state, and its attempted identification with the city of Mazaka, corresponding to modern-day Kayseri, is inaccurate. These sources also mention the existence of "21 strong towns and their surrounding villages" (Neo-Assyrian Akkadian: 𒌋𒌋𒁹 𒌷𒈨𒌍𒋙𒉡 𒆗𒉡𒋾 𒅇 𒌷𒈨𒌍 𒌉𒈨𒌍 𒁲 𒇷𒈨𒋾𒋙𒉡, romanized: 21 ālānišunu dannūti u ālāni ṣeḫrūti ša limētišunu) in Ḫilakku.

During the Neo-Babylonian period, the capital of Pirindu was Urā (or Urâ or Uraʾa), and another of its royal cities was Kirši.

== History ==
=== Bronze Age ===
In the Late Bronze Age, the region which would later become Ḫilakku was part of the kingdom of Kizzuwatna and later of the southeastern border regions of the kingdom of Tarḫuntašša.

=== Iron Age ===
==== Kingdom of Ḫilakku ====
Some time during the early Iron Age, the kingdom of Ḫilakku was formed as a result of the disintegration of Tarḫuntašša, although nothing is known about it during its early history except that it maintained close cultural relations with Ḫiyawa and the other states to its east.

Some time in the 11th century BC, the kingdom of Melid might have annexed Ḫilakku, although it is uncertain whether Ḫilakku is to be identified with the land of Ḫilikka which was the target of Melid's campaign according to Melidian inscriptions.

In the 9th century BC, Assyria experienced a resurgence in the form of the fledgling Neo-Assyrian Empire, leading to the formation of various military coalitions by the various Neo-Hittite states in reaction to the campaigns of the Neo-Assyrian king Ashurnasirpal II (r. 883 – 859 BC) in Syria during the c. 870s to c. 860s BC. The campaigns of Ashurnasirpal II's son and successor, Shalmaneser III (r. 859 – 824 BC) would further lead to an intensification of activities in opposition to the Neo-Assyrian Empire in the kingdoms of Syria.

After Shalmaneser III had defeated a coalition of Karkamiš, Samʾal, Pattin and Bit Adini in Samʾalian territory during his first campaign to the west in 858 BC, the king Suppiluliumas of Pattin convened the coalition again when Shalmaneser III threatened his own kingdom. In addition to the coalition forces, the Arab tribe of Yasbuq and the country of Yahan from the Aramaean kingdom of Bit Agusi sent reinforcements to these allied forces.

And, although the Neo-Assyrian Empire was a more distant threat to Ḫilakku and its western neighbour Ḫiyawa, which were located to the west of the passes of the Amanus Mountains, Shalmaneser III had erected a gigantic statue of himself at the foot of these mountains as a warning that they were not safe from his forces. Therefore, Ḫilakku and Ḫiyawa feared that Shalmaneser III would attack them next should Pattin fall: during this time, Ḫilakku was ruled by the king Piḫirim, who, along with his neighbour Katî of Ḫiyawa, also contributed troops to this alliance, which was, however, defeated by the Neo-Assyrian army.

Katî of Ḫiyawa and Piḫirim of Ḫilakku had nonetheless managed to escape from this defeat with their troops unharmed, and Shalmaneser III at most only demanded tribute from them.

Although Shalmaneser III campaigned against Ḫiyawa in 839 BC, into the Tabalian region in 837 BC, and later campaigned into Ḫiyawa again in 834 and 833 BC, he, however, did not attempt to attack Ḫilakku, which was further to the west of his campaign route, as well as because Ḫilakku was more isolated and inaccessible due to its rough terrain.

The king Ḫalparuntiyas of Gurgum might have attacked Ḫilakku during the campaign of Shalmaneser III against Ḫiyawa, although it is uncertain whether Ḫilakku is to be identified with the land of Ḫirikka which was the target of Ḫalparuntiyas's campaign according to his records.

Ḫilakku largely remained out of reach of Neo-Assyrian aggression, and, while both Ḫilakku and Ḫiyawa were mentioned in the records of the Neo-Assyrian king Tiglath-pileser III (r. 745 – 727 BC, Ḫilakku was not listed as one of his tributaries, showing that Ḫilakku had remained independent from Neo-Assyrian imperialism.

Ḫilakku remained independent of Neo-Assyrian rule until the late 8th century BC, but both it as well as Ḫiyawa (under the name of Que) had become provinces of the Neo-Assyrian Empire at some point during the reigns of the Neo-Assyrian king Shalmaneser V (r. 727 – 722 BC) or Sargon II (r. 722 – 705 BC).

===== Between Assyria and Phrygia =====
Following the union of the Phrygians and the Muški under the Phrygian king Midas, this latter king was able to extend his kingdom to the east across the Halys river into the former core territory of the Hittite Empire and build a large empire in Anatolia which reached the Aegean Sea in the west and the environs of the Euphrates and borders of the Tabalian region in the east and south. The eastward expansionist ventures of Midas in the east soon led to his fledgling Phrygian empire becoming a major rival to Neo-Assyrian power in eastern Anatolia, especially when Midas initiated contacts with Neo-Assyrian vassals, causing the Tabalian region, which bordered on Ḫiyawa to the north, to become contested between the Neo-Assyrian and Phrygian empires.

As part of his expansionist ventures, Midas attempted to connect his empire to the Mediterranean Sea through Laranda and the eastern bank of the Calycadnus river valley.

After this, Midas resorted to attempting to reach the Mediterranean sea through the route of Bozkır-Hadim-Ermenek to reach the sea passages of the mountainous regions to the west of Ḫiyawa.

Since the Tabalian region was a subject of the Neo-Assyrian Empire, this Phrygian expansion increased the possibility of war between the two rival empires. Thus, the Tabalian region found itself wedged between the Neo-Assyrian and Phrygian empires, both of whom saw it as a strategically useful buffer zone to contain the other's expansionist ambitions.

Therefore, Midas tried to persuade the still independent local rulers of the Tabalian region to switch their allegiances to Phrygia: the loyalty of the Tabalian kings to the Neo-Assyrian Empire was unsteady, and those among them who were diplomatically approached by Midas might have preferred renouncing their allegiance to the Neo-Assyrian Empire and instead allying with Midas. Thus, the kings of the Tabalian region found themselves having to choose whether aligning themselves with the Neo-Assyrian or the Phrygian empire was in their interests, and several of them did accept Midas's offer.

In addition to the wavering loyalty of the Tabalian kings, the possibility of an alliance between Midas and Rusa I of Urartu further threatened Neo-Assyrian power not only in southeastern Anatolia, but also throughout all of eastern Anatolia and in northern Mesopotamia.

Assuming the king wryk of the Cebelires Daǧı inscription was the same as Awarikus of Ḫiyawa, his kingdom might have extended to the western limits of Rough Cilicia and nearly reached Pamphylia, and would thus have included Ḫilakku.

===== As part of Bīt-Burutaš =====
To counter the threat of the rising power of Phrygia, Sargon II tried to establish a centralised authority under a ruler whom he could trust in the Tabalian region, and he therefore reorganised the kingdom of Tabal proper into the state of Bīt-Burutaš under the rule of the king Ambaris, who was himself the son of the former Tabalian king Ḫullî, and to whom he had married his daughter Aḫat-abiša: as part of this arrangement, the new kingdom of Bīt-Burutaš consisted of the kingdom of Tabal which had been significantly enlarged with the territory of Ḫilakku, which had itself been offered to Ambaris as Aḫat-abiša's dowry.

Since Ḫilakku was a country with a rough terrain and its inhabitants were extremely independent, the Neo-Assyrian rule over it was itself nominal at most, and it is unlikely that Ambaris would have had any significant involvement in managing Ḫilakku.

However, Midas continued pressuring the western Neo-Assyrian territories and intensified his efforts to persuade the local rulers of this region to renounce their vassalage to the Neo-Assyrian Empire, and he even launched attacks as far south as the territories of Ḫiyawa. In addition to finding themselves pressured by Phrygia or Urartu, several of the western vassals of the Neo-Assyrian Empire might also have themselves initiated contacts with Phrygia and Urartu with the hope of freeing themselves from Neo-Assyrian suzerainty, thus leading to a series of anti-Assyrian uprisings by the Anatolian vassals of the Neo-Assyrian Empire during the rest of Sargon II's reign.

Ambaris himself came under pressure from Midas, who attempted to persuade him to renounce Neo-Assyrian allegiance and join him, initially through diplomatic means and later through military threats. This situation left Ambaris with little choice but to accept an alliance with Phrygia and renounce his allegiance to the Neo-Assyrian Empire. Facing increased pressure from both Midas of Phrygia and Argišti II of Urartu, Ambaris communicated with them seeking guarantees that they would protect him should he break his ties with the Neo-Assyrian Empire.

Neo-Assyrian intelligence however intercepted Ambaris's messages to Phrygia and Urartu, causing him to lose favour with Sargon II, who accused him of conspiring with these rival powers and consequently deported Ambaris, his family and his chief courtiers to Assyria in 713 BCE, after which a Neo-Assyrian governor was imposed on Bīt-Burutaš, Ḫilakku and Ḫiyawa by Sargon II, with the first of these being Aššur-šarru-uṣur, who possibly as early as 713 BCE was appointed as governor of Ḫiyawa and also held authority on Ḫilakku and the Tabalian region.

Thus, after the deposition of Ambaris in 713 BC, Ḫilakku and Bīt-Burutaš were both placed under direct Neo-Assyrian rule as provinces.

===== Regained independence =====
Ḫilakku was able to regain its independence during the several rebellions against the Neo-Assyrian Empire that broke out in Anatolia after Sargon II's death, with one Kirūa who was city-lord of Illubru, instigating a revolt in Ḫilakku. The Ḫiyawaean cities of Ingirâ and Tarsus also joined this rebellion and blocked the passes in the Amanus range which led to Ḫiyawa.

In 696 BC, Sargon II's son and successor, Sennacherib (r. 705 – 681 BC), sent an army to suppress this rebellion: the Neo-Assyrian forces captured Ingirâ and Tarsus, before besieging Illubru and flaying the rebels after seizing it, following which they deported Illubru's inhabitants and resettled it, and erected a stela dedicated to the Assyrian national god Aššur there. However, Sennacherib was only able to deport some inhabitants of Ḫilakku and destroy their towns, showing that Ḫilakku was independent of the Neo-Assyrian Empire by then.

Therefore, although the suppression of this revolt possibly allowed Sennacherib to reimpose a level of control on Que, Ḫilakku was able to maintain its independence.

According to records of the later Hellenistic Babylonian writer Berossus summarised by the Roman historian Eusebius of Caesarea, Ionian Greek pirates also participated in this rebellion, although Sennacherib appears to have failed at subduing them due to their greater mobility.

Although Sennacherib's son and successor Esarhaddon (r. 681 – 669 BC) claimed to have conquered the rebellious people of Ḫilakku, his actions there only amounted to a raid against its population, whom Esarhaddon himself conceded was unruly and insubmissive.

By the reign of Esarhaddon's son and successor Ashurbanipal (r. 669 – 631 BC), Ḫilakku was fully independent, and Ashurbanipal himself described Ḫilakku as not having submitted to his predecessors.

===== Cimmerian invasions =====
In 679 BC, Esarhaddon campaigned in the Tabalian region against the Cimmerians from his base in Que and Ḫilakku, resulting in the defeat and killing of the Cimmerian king Teušpâ in Ḫubišna and the annexation of a part of the territory of Ḫilakku and of the sub-kingdom of Kundu and Sissu in Que. Esarhaddon appears to have reached Ḫubišna by passing through the Calycadnus river valley and bypassing the Anti-Taurus Mountains and Tabal proper.

Despite this victory, and although Esarhaddon had managed to stop the advance of Cimmerians in Que so it remained under Neo-Assyrian control, the military operations were not successful enough for the Assyrians to firmly occupy the areas around of Ḫubišna, nor were they able to secure the borders of the Neo-Assyrian Empire, leaving Que vulnerable to incursions from Tabal, Kuzzurak and Ḫilakku, who were allied to the western Cimmerians who were establishing themselves in Anatolia at this time. Thus, Esarhaddon was left remaining wary of possible attacks on Que by Ḫilakku or Tabal.

Some time around c. 675 BCE, the Cimmerians invaded and destroyed the Phrygian empire and sacked its capital of Gordion, due to which Midas committed suicide. The Cimmerians consequently settled in Phrygia and subdued part of the Phrygians so that they controlled a large area consisting of Phrygia from its western limits which bordered on Lydia to its eastern boundaries neighbouring the Neo-Assyrian Empire, after which they made the Tabalian region into their centre of operations.

Neo-Assyrian sources from around this same time, therefore, recorded a Cimmerian presence in the area of Tabal, and, between c. 672 and c. 669 BCE, a Neo-Assyrian oracular text recorded that the Cimmerians, together with the Phrygians and the Cilicians, were threatening the Neo-Assyrian Empire's newly conquered territory of Melid. The Cimmerians were thus active in Tabal, Ḫilakku and Phrygia in the 670s BCE, and, in alliance with these former two states, were attacking the western Neo-Assyrian provinces.

Thus, the Cimmerians became the masters of Anatolia, where they controlled a large territory bordering Lydia in the west, covering Phrygia, and reaching Cilicia and the borders of Urartu in the east. The disturbances experienced by the Neo-Assyrian Empire as result of the activities of the Cimmerians in Anatolia led to many of the rulers of this region to try to break away from Neo-Assyrian overlordship, with Ḫilakku having become an independent polity again under the king Sandašarme by the time that Esarhaddon had been succeeded as king of the Neo-Assyrian Empire by his son, Ashurbanipal (r. 669 – 631 BCE), so that by then the Cimmerians had effectively ended Neo-Assyrian control in Anatolia.

The defeat of the Cimmerians by the Lydian king Gyges between c. 665 to c. 660 BCE weakened their allies, Mugallu of Tabal and Sandašarme of Ḫilakku, enough that they were left with no choice but to submit to the authority of the Neo-Assyrian Empire in c. 662 BCE, forcing Sandašarme to send an embassy as well as one of his daughters with a large dowry to the Neo-Assyrian capital of Nineveh for the royal harem.

Thus, Ḫilakku was beyond the limits of concrete Neo-Assyrian control, and whatever control the Neo-Assyrian Empire might have had on it was weak and temporary at most, unlike Ḫiyawa, which the Neo-Assyrian Empire was able to keep as a province under three governors.

Ḫilakku was the only Neo-Hittite which managed to survive the collapse of the Neo-Assyrian Empire, after which, the kingdom's original name of Ḫilakku ceased to be mentioned in Mesopotamian records, and the state itself instead reappeared in the records of the Neo-Babylonian Empire under the name of Pirindu. Due to its then geographical isolation, Pirindu was less influenced by the cultures of the polities to its east, and, along with the Tabalian states, remained one of the last bastions of still existing Neo-Hittite culture after the end of the Neo-Assyrian Empire.

According to a text from the reign of the Neo-Babylonian king Nebuchadnezzar II (r. 605 – 562 BC), he had captured prisoners from Pirindu in 592 or 591 BC, during a campaign which might be recorded in a Neo-Babylonian text mentioning conquests "from Egypt to Ḫuwê (Ḫiyawa) and Lydia."

===== The 6th century BC =====
Ḫilakku continued to exist as an independent state in southeastern Anatolia under the rule of a native dynasty in the 6th century BC. The Ancient Greeks borrowed the name of Ḫilakku, under the form of Kilikia (Ancient Greek: Κιλικία; Latin: Cilicia), to designate this state, thus extending the name of Ḫilakku to the whole of the territories of both Ḫilakku and Ḫiyawa.

This state was a continuation of older Ḫilakku, and the Greek designation of Kilikia extended the use of the name of the state of Ḫilakku to the territory of both Ḫilakku and its neighbour Ḫiyawa. This naming convention arose out of an expansion of Ḫilakku through the annexation of Ḫiyawa, which expanded Cilicia's borders until the Euphrates, which formed its border with Armenia. As a result, Ḫiyawa's name disappeared after 555 BC, and its territory was known as part of Kilikia to the Greeks, while the city of Tarsus became the capital of this expanded Ḫilakku.

To the north, this Cilician kingdom reached the Halys river, which flowed through its territory, and in the east, the border between Cilicia and Syria was located at Posideion.

Meanwhile, the Neo-Assyrian period distinction between Ḫilakku and Ḫiyawa was preserved in the Greek designation for the two sections of Cilicia: Kilikia Trakheia (Ancient Greek: Κιλικία Τραχεῖα, lit. 'Rough Cilicia'; Latin: Cilicia Aspera) corresponded to Ḫilakku, while Kilikia Pedias (Ancient Greek: Κιλικία Πεδιάς, lit. 'Plain Cilicia'; Latin: Cilicia Campestris) corresponded to Ḫiyawa. Thus, the older state of Hilakku had become the core of the Classical kingdom of Cilicia.

The earliest recorded ruler of the kingdom of Cilicia in Greek sources was Syennesis I, who, according to the Ancient Greek historian Herodotus of Halicarnassus, mediated in 585 BC the peace treaty which followed the end of the conflict which had opposed the Lydian and Median empires. The reason why Syennesis I mediated this peace treaty might have been because his kingdom had grown in territory significantly after annexing the Tabalian region following the end of the Neo-Assyrian Empire but before 585 BC, due to which the Halys flowed through Cilicia.

Herodotus of Halicarnassus also claimed that the Cilicians and the Lycians were the only peoples of Anatolia who had not been conquered by the Lydian king Croesus. However, it is unknown whether this means that the Cilicians and Lycians were able to resist the Lydian conquest, or whether Croesus did not find any interest in annexing them. As a result, Cilicia was the last Neo-Hittite state which still existed in the period preceding the rise of the Achaemenid Empire.

===== Campaign of Neriglissar =====
In 557 BC, the king Appuwašu of Pirindu attempted to attack the Syrian provinces of the Neo-Babylonian Empire, possibly as a result of tensions regarding the control of Ḫuwê.

Nebuchadnezzar II's son-in-law, the Neo-Babylonian king Neriglissar (r. 560 – 556 BC), responded by marching to Ḫuwê, where Appuwašu launched a failed ambush attempt on him before being defeated, after which Neriglissar pursued Appuwašu into Pirindu itself, where he captured Ura and Kiršu, after which he marched till the sea at Kelenderis and then to the island fortress of Pitusu, before marching till Sallunê, which was the most western city on the coast of Cilicia, and to the borders of the Lydian Empire before returning to Babylon.

The aim of Neriglissar's campaign was not to dominate Pirindu, but to expel Appuwašu out of Ḫuwê. Neriglissar appears to have been successful, and Appuwašu was forced to retreat to the west of the Calycadnus river.

===== Submission to the Achaemenid Empire =====
In the mid-6th century BC, the kingdom of Cilicia supported the founding king of the Persian Achaemenid Empire, Cyrus II, in his wars against Croesus of Lydia, as a consequence of which Cilicia became a vassal of the Achaemenid empire as from c. 542 BC, and the Cilician rulers became part of the Achaemenid administration.

Cilicia and Cilicians do not appear in any of the Achaemenid Empire's extant lists of people ruled by it, although Achaemenid rule of Cilicia is attested in Western sources.

Under early Achaemenid rule, Cilicia maintained a significant degree of autonomy and the native rulers acted as satraps (governors) for the Achaemenid administration, with their authority extending as far west as Aspendus.

Cilicia during the Achaemenid period was inhabited by tribal populations who were led by native chieftains, and it contained fortified strongholds protecting its agricultural land and its inhabitants, as well as various native and Persian cities and towns.

Nevertheless, the western part of Cilicia, corresponding to the later Graeco-Roman Rough Cilicia, probably remained independent of Persian rule and of the administration of the satrap of Tarsus, except for the narrow strip of flat land along its coast, due to which the imperial authorities often led repressive measures against these inhabitants of the hilly regions.

During the reign of the Achaemenid king of kings Darius I, Cilicia was used as an assembly point for the military forces which Mardonius used to campaign in Europe as well as those which Datis and Artaphernes used to campaign against both the Asian and European Greeks.

Under Darius I's successor, Xerxes I, Cilicia contributed both troops and ships for the Achaemenid conquest of the Aegean Sea: the Cilician ruler Syennesis II led these ships, but was killed in battle. At this time, the ruling dynasty of Cilicia had been linked by marriage bonds with Carian notables.

Syennesis II was succeeded by one Xeinagoras of Halicarnassus, who had no previous ties to Cilicia and was appointed as satrap of Cilicia by Xerxes I as a reward for his service.

Cilicia remained under efficient administration, and it would continue to provide troops for the Achaemenid wars in Anatolia, Egypt and Cyprus.

===== End =====
In 401 BC, the Achaemenid king of kings Artaxerxes II abolished the autonomy of Cilicia in reaction to the local Cilician ruler Syennesis III's support for the rebellion of Cyrus the Younger, resulting in the kingdom of Cilicia being abolished and fully integrated into the Achaemenid empire as a province ruled by and appointed by the Achaemenid king of kings, which it would remain until the end of the Achaemenid Empire in 333 BC.

===== Legacy =====
Ancient Cilicia features in Greek mythology as a place whose name is derived from a people named the Kilikes (Κίλικες) who lived in the Troad. The Hittitologist Trevor Bryce considers it plausible that populations from the Troad might have migrated to the southeast into the region which later became Cilicia during the drastic changes which formed part of the Late Bronze Age collapse at the end of the 2nd millennium BC.

== Society and culture ==
=== Population ===
Like Ḫiyawa and the kingdoms of the nearby Tabalian region, the population of Ḫilakku was descended from the largely Late Bronze Age Luwian inhabitants of the region and remained so until the Hellenistic and Roman periods.

Esarhaddon's description of the population of Ḫilakku as "evil Hittites" (Neo-Assyrian Akkadian: 𒇽𒉺𒋼𒂊 𒅆𒉡𒌑𒋾, romanized: Ḫattê lemnūti) attests of the predominantly Luwian character of the population of Ḫilakku throughout the 1st millennium BC, and Luwian personal names would remain attested in Ḫilakku until the Roman period.

=== Phrygian influence ===
The presence of a monument at Dibektaşi similar to Phrygian stepped altars or cult thrones of the goddess Kubeleya suggests that aspects of Phrygian culture, such as the worship of Kubeleya, had reached into Ḫilakku.

=== Greek and Phoenician colonisation ===
During the 9th and 8th centuries BC, Cypriots, Greeks and Phoenicians settled in cities founded by the native peoples of Ḫiyawa and Ḫilakku which were located on the maritime trade routes linking these regions to the western Mediterranean sea and also functioned as outlets for resources from the inner regions of Anatolia.

An inscription dating from c. 625 to c. 600 BC attests of the presence of Phoenicians in Pirindu.

The increased importance of these sites led to the Neo-Assyrian Empire taking an interest in this region, beginning with the successful campaigns of Sargon II, which led to a weakening of the cities to the east of the Calycadnus River. This pushed the Greek and Phoenician traders to the west of the Calycadnus river, beyond the control of the Neo-Assyrian Empire and its restrictions on control and cultural influence on Ḫiyawa and Ḫilakku, where they founded several settlements during the 8th and 7th centuries BC, such as Nagidos and Kelenderis, founded by Samos, Soli founded by Lindos, and Aphrodisias. These colonies were densely populated by traders over the course of c. 750 to c. 500 BC, and the population of Ionian Greeks and Cypriots in these colonies later increased.

=== Administrative structure ===
The rulers of the kingdom of Cilicia styled themselves using the title of Suennesis (Συέννεσις), derived from the name of their founding king Syennesis I, which was derived from Luwian *zuwannissas, which was itself the genitival adjective of the term zuwannis (𔗵𔗬𔗐𔓯𔗦), meaning lit. 'dog'.

== List of rulers ==
- ᵐPiḫirim (Neo-Assyrian Akkadian: 𒁹𒉿𒄭𒊑𒅎), r. c. 858 BC
- ᵐAmbaris (Neo-Assyrian Akkadian: 𒁹𒄠𒁀𒊑𒄑), r. c. 718 BC – 713 BC
- ᵐSandašarme (Neo-Assyrian Akkadian: 𒁹𒊓𒀭𒁕𒊬𒈨; Hieroglyphic Luwian: *Sanda-Sarrumas), r. c. 662 BC
- Syennesis I (Ancient Greek: Συέννεσις; Luwian: *Zuwannissas), r. c. 585 BC
- ᵐAppuwašu (Neo-Babylonian Akkadian: 𒁹𒀊𒁍𒌑𒀀𒍪), r. c. 557 BC
- Syennesis II (Ancient Greek: Συέννεσις; Luwian: *Zuwannissas), r. c. 480 BC
- Xeinagoras of Halicarnassus (Ancient Greek: Ξειναγόρας), r. c. 470s BC
- Syennesis III (Ancient Greek: Συέννεσις; Luwian: *Zuwannissas), r. c. 401 BC

== Sources ==
- Adalı, Selim Ferruh (2017). "Cimmerians and the Scythians: the Impact of Nomadic Powers on the Assyrian Empire and the Ancient Near East". In Kim, Hyun Jin; Vervaet, Frederik Juliaan; Adalı, Selim Ferruh (eds.). Eurasian Empires in Antiquity and the Early Middle Ages Contact and Exchange between the Graeco- Roman World, Inner Asia and China. Cambridge, United Kingdom: Cambridge University Press. pp. 60–82. ISBN 978-1-107-19041-2.
- Aro, Sanna (2013). "Tabal". In Streck, Michael P. [in German]; Frantz-Szabó, Gabriella; Krebernik, Manfred [in German]; Bonacossi, D. Morandi; Postgate, J. N.; Seidl, Ursula [in German]; Stol, M.; Wilhelm, Gernot [in German] (eds.). Reallexikon der Assyriologie und Vorderasiatischen Archäologie [Encyclopaedia of Ancient Near Eastern Studies] (in German). Vol. 13. Berlin, Germany; New York City, United States: Walter de Gruyter. ISBN 978-3-110-30715-3.
- Aro, Sanna (2023). "Vanishing kingdoms: Tabal and Tuwana during the seventh century BC". In Draycott, Catherine M.; Branting, Scott; Lehner, Joseph W.; Özarslan, Yasemin (eds.). From Midas to Cyrus and Other Stories: Papers on Iron Age Anatolia in Honour of Geoffrey and Françoise Summers. BIAA Monograph Series. London, United Kingdom: British Institute at Ankara. pp. 113–135. ISBN 978-1-912-09011-2.
- Baker, Heather D. (2023). "The Assyrian Empire: A View from Within". In Radner, Karen; Moeller, Nadine; Potts, Daniel T. (eds.). The Age of Assyria. The Oxford History of the Ancient Near East. Vol. 4. New York City, United States: Oxford University Press. pp. 257–351. ISBN 978-0-190-68763-2.
- Bryce, Trevor (2009). The Routledge Handbook of the Peoples and Places of Ancient Western Asia: From the Early Bronze Age to the Fall of the Persian Empire. London, United Kingdom: Routledge. ISBN 978-0-415-39485-7.
- Bryce, Trevor (2012). The World of the Neo-Hittite Kingdoms: A Political and Military History. Oxford, United Kingdom: Oxford University Press. ISBN 978-0-199-21872-1.
- Casabonne, Olivier; Lebreton, Stéphane; Lebrun, René (2013). "Notes Ciliciennes" [Cilician Notes]. Anatolia antiqua. Eski Anadolu (in French). 21. Institut français d'études anatoliennes: 87–92. doi:10.3406/anata.2013.1341.
- D'Alfonso, Lorenzo (2012). "Tabal, an 'out-group' definition in the first Millennium BCE". In Lanfranchi, Giovanni B.; Bonacossi, Daniele Morandi; Pappi, Cinzia; Ponchia, Simonetta [in German] (eds.). Leggo! Studies Presented to Frederick Mario Fales on the Occasion of His 65ᵗʰ Birthday. Wiesbaden, Germany: Harrassowitz Verlag. pp. 173–194. ISBN 978-3-447-06659-4.
- DeGrado, Jessie (2022). "Azatiwada's Empire: Adapting Assyrian Imagery in the Bilingual Karatepe Inscription". News from the Lands of the Hittites. 5–6. Mimesis Edizioni: 21–45.
- Diakonoff, I. M. (1985). "Media". In Gershevitch, Ilya (ed.). The Cambridge History of Iran. Vol. 2. Cambridge, United Kingdom: Cambridge University Press. pp. 36–148. ISBN 978-0-521-20091-2.
- Ebeling, E. [in German] (1932). "Ambaris". In Ebeling, Erich [in German]; Meissner, Bruno (eds.). Reallexikon der Assyriologie und Vorderasiatischen Archäologie [Encyclopaedia of Ancient Near Eastern Studies] (in German). Vol. 1. Berlin, Germany; Leipzig, Germany: Walter de Gruyter. pp. 93–94. ISBN 978-3-112-35785-9.
- Edzard, D. O. (1980). "Kirua". In Edzard, Dietz Otto; Calmeyer, P. [in German]; Moortgat, A.; Otten, H. [in German]; Röllig, W. [in German]; von Soden, W.; Wiseman, D. J. (eds.). Reallexikon der Assyriologie und Vorderasiatischen Archäologie [Encyclopaedia of Ancient Near Eastern Studies] (in German). Vol. 5. Berlin, Germany; New York City, United States: Walter de Gruyter. p. 607. ISBN 978-3-110-07192-4.
- Glassner, Jean-Jacques (2004). Foster, Benjamin R. (ed.). Mesopotamian Chronicles. Writings from the Ancient World. Vol. 19. Atlanta, United States: Society of Biblical Literature. ISBN 978-1-589-83090-5.
- Grayson, A.K. [in German] (1975). Assyrian and Babylonian Chronicles. Texts from Cuneiform Sources. Vol. 5. Locust Valley, United States: J. J. Augustin Publisher.
- Grayson, A. K. [in German] (1991). "Assyria 668-635 B.C.: the reign of Ashurbanipal". In Boardman, John; Edwards, I. E. S.; Hammond, N. G. L.; Sollberger, E.; Walker, C. B. F. (eds.). The Assyrian and Babylonian Empires and other States of the Near East, from the Eighth to the Sixth Centuries B.C. The Cambridge Ancient History. Vol. 3. Cambridge, United Kingdom: Cambridge University Press. pp. 142–161. ISBN 978-1-139-05429-4.
- Grousset, René (1970). The Empire of the Steppes: A History of Central Asia. Translated by Walford, Naomi. New Brunswick, United States: Rutgers University Press. ISBN 978-0-813-51304-1.
- Hawkins, J.D. [in German] (1975). "Ḫilakku". In Edzard, Dietz Otto; Calmeyer, P. [in German]; Moortgat, A.; Otten, H. [in German]; Röllig, Wolfgang [in German]; v. Soden, W.; Wiseman, D. J. (eds.). Reallexikon der Assyriologie und Vorderasiatischen Archäologie [Encyclopaedia of Ancient Near Eastern Studies]. Vol. 4. Berlin, Germany; New York City, United States: Walter de Gruyter. pp. 402–403. ISBN 978-3-110-06772-9.
- Hawkins, John D [in German] (2000a). Inscriptions of the Iron Age. Part 1: Text, Introduction, Karatepe, Karkamiš, Tell Ahmar, Maraş, Malatya, Commagene. Corpus of Hieroglyphic Luwian Inscriptions. Vol. 1. Berlin, Germany; New York City, United States: Walter de Gruyter. ISBN 978-3-110-10864-4.
- Hawkins, John D. [in German] (2000b). Inscriptions of the Iron Age. Part 3: Plates. Corpus of Hieroglyphic Luwian Inscriptions. Vol. 1. Berlin, Germany; New York City, United States: Walter de Gruyter. ISBN 978-3-110-10864-4.
- Hawkins, J.D. [in German] (2008). "Que". In Streck, Michael P. [in German]; Frantz-Szabó, Gabriella; Krebernik, M. [in German]; Postgate, J.N.; Seidl, U. [in German]; Stol, M.; Wilhelm, G. [in German]; Ecklin, Sabine (eds.). Reallexikon der Assyriologie und Vorderasiatischen Archäologie [Encyclopaedia of Ancient Near Eastern Studies] (in German). Vol. 11. Berlin, Germany; New York City, United States: Walter de Gruyter. pp. 191–195. ISBN 978-3-110-20383-7.
- Ivantchik, Askold (1993a). Les Cimmériens au Proche-Orient [The Cimmerians in the Near East] (PDF) (in French). Fribourg, Switzerland; Göttingen, Germany: Éditions Universitaires (Switzerland); Vandenhoeck & Ruprecht (Germany). ISBN 978-3-727-80876-0.
- Kessler, K. [in German] (1980). "Illubru". In Edzard, Dietz Otto; Calmeyer, P. [in German]; Moortgat, A.; Otten, H. [in German]; Röllig, W. [in German]; von Soden, W.; Wiseman, D. J. (eds.). Reallexikon der Assyriologie und Vorderasiatischen Archäologie [Encyclopaedia of Ancient Near Eastern Studies] (in German). Vol. 5. Berlin, Germany; New York City, United States: Walter de Gruyter. p. 60. ISBN 978-3-110-07192-4.
- Kryszeń, Adam (2023a). "Ḫilika". Hittite Toponyms. University of Mainz; University of Würzburg.
- Kryszeń, Adam (2023b). "Pirundummeya". Hittite Toponyms. University of Mainz; University of Würzburg.
- Novák, Mirko [in German]; Fuchs, Andreas [in German] (2021). "Azatiwada, Awariku from the "House of Mopsos", and Assyria: On the dating of Karatepe in Cilicia". In Payne, Annick; Velhartická, Šárka; Wintjes, Jorit [in German] (eds.). Beyond All Boundaries: Anatolia in the First Millennium BC. Orbis Biblicus et Orientalis. Vol. 295. Leuven, Belgium: Peeters Publishers. pp. 397–466. ISBN 978-9-042-94884-6.
- Olbrycht, Marek Jan [in Polish] (2000a). "The Cimmerian Problem Re-Examined: the Evidence of the Classical Sources". In Pstrusińska, Jadwiga [in Polish]; Fear, Andrew (eds.). Collectanea Celto-Asiatica Cracoviensia. Kraków: Księgarnia Akademicka. pp. 71–100. ISBN 978-8-371-88337-8.
- Parzinger, Hermann (2004). Die Skythen [The Scythians] (in German). Munich, Germany: Verlag C.H.Beck. ISBN 978-3-406-50842-4.
- Phillips, E. D. (1972). "The Scythian Domination in Western Asia: Its Record in History, Scripture and Archaeology". World Archaeology. 4 (2): 129–138. doi:10.1080/00438243.1972.9979527. JSTOR 123971.
- Röllig, W. [in German] (1971). "Griechen" [Greeks]. In Weidner, Ernst [in German]; von Soden, Wolfram; Borger, R.; Calmeyer, P. [in German]; Edzard, D. O.; Falkenstein, A.; Moortgat, A.; Otten, H. [in German]; Röllig, W. [in German]; Wiseman, D. (eds.). Reallexikon der Assyriologie und Vorderasiatischen Archäologie [Encyclopaedia of Ancient Near Eastern Studies] (in German). Vol. 3. Berlin, Germany; New York City, United States: Walter de Gruyter. pp. 643–647. ISBN 978-3-110-03705-0.
- Oreshko, Rostyslav (2020). "Ethnic Groups and Language Contact in Lycia (I): the 'Maritime Interface'". Journal of Language Relationship. 18 (1). Russian State University for the Humanities; Institute of Linguistics of the Russian Academy of Sciences; Gorgias Press: 13–40. doi:10.31826/jlr-2020-181-205.
- Simon, Zsolt (2018). "Sapaziti, Sapalulme und die Suppiluliumas von W/Pal(a)stin(a/i)" [Sapaziti, Sapalulme and the Suppiluliumas of W/Pal(a)stin(a/i)]. Altorientalische Forschungen [Ancient Near Eastern Research]. 45 (1). Walter de Gruyter: 122–132. doi:10.1515/aofo-2018-0011.
- Simon, Zsolt (2019). "Syennesis: Personenname, kein luwischer Herrschertitel" [Syennesis: Personal Name, not a Luwian Royal Title]. Nouvelles Assyriologiques Brèves et Utilitaires [Brief and Useful Assyriological News]. 91 (3): 122–123.
- Simon, Zsolt (2021). "401 BC: The Year the Neo-Hittite Statehood Ended". In Payne, Annick; Velhartická, Šárka; Wintjes, Jorit [in German] (eds.). Beyond All Boundaries: Anatolia in the First Millennium BC. Orbis Biblicus et Orientalis. Vol. 295. Leuven, Belgium: Peeters Publishers. pp. 675–688. ISBN 978-9-042-94884-6.
- Starke, Frank [in German] (2006). "Asia Minor". In Cancik, Hubert [in German]; Schneider, Helmuth [in German]; Salazar, Christine F.; Möller, Astrid [in German]; Ruppel, Antonia; Warburton, David [in German] (eds.). Brill's New Pauly: Encyclopaedia of the Ancient World. Vol. 2. Leiden, Netherlands; Boston, United States: Brill. pp. 118–130. doi:10.1163/1574-9347_bnp_e614980. ISBN 90-04-12265-6.
- Streck, M.P. [in German] (2005). "Pirindu". In Edzard, Dietz Otto; Streck, M.P. [in German]; Krebernik, M. [in German]; Postgate, J.N.; Seidl, U. [in German]; Stol, M.; Wilhelm, G. [in German]; Frantz-Szabó, Gabriella; Hellwag, Ursula (eds.). Reallexikon der Assyriologie und Vorderasiatischen Archäologie [Encyclopaedia of Ancient Near Eastern Studies] (in German). Vol. 10. Berlin, Germany; New York City, United States: Walter de Gruyter. pp. 572–573. ISBN 978-3-110-18535-5.
- Sulimirski, Tadeusz; Taylor, T. F. (1991). "The Scythians". In Boardman, John; Edwards, I. E. S.; Hammond, N. G. L.; Sollberger, E.; Walker, C. B. F. (eds.). The Assyrian and Babylonian Empires and other States of the Near East, from the Eighth to the Sixth Centuries B.C. The Cambridge Ancient History. Vol. 3. Cambridge, United Kingdom: Cambridge University Press. pp. 547–590. ISBN 978-1-139-05429-4.
- Täuber, Hans [in German] (2003). "Cilices, Cilicia". In Cancik, Hubert [in German]; Schneider, Helmuth [in German]; Salazar, Christine F.; Möller, Astrid [in German]; Ruppel, Antonia; Warburton, David [in German] (eds.). Brill's New Pauly: Encyclopaedia of the Ancient World. Vol. 3. Leiden, Netherlands; Boston, United States: Brill. p. 329-330. doi:10.1163/1574-9347_bnp_e613620. ISBN 90-04-12259-1.
- Tokhtas’ev, Sergei R. [in Russian] (1991). "Cimmerians". Encyclopædia Iranica. New York City, United States: Encyclopædia Iranica Foundation; Brill Publishers.
- Weeden, Mark (2010). "Tuwati and Wasusarma: Imitating the Behaviour of Assyria". Iraq. 72. British Institute for the Study of Iraq: 39–61. doi:10.1017/S0021088900000589.
- Weeden, Mark (2023). "The Iron Age States of Central Anatolia and Northern Syria". In Radner, Karen; Moeller, Nadine; Potts, Daniel T. (eds.). The Age of Assyria. The Oxford History of the Ancient Near East. Vol. 4. New York City, United States: Oxford University Press. pp. 912–1026. ISBN 978-0-190-68763-2.
- Weiskopf, Michael (1991). "Cilicia". Encyclopædia Iranica. New York City, United States: Encyclopædia Iranica Foundation; Brill Publishers.
- Zoroğlu, Levent (1994). "Cilicia Tracheia in the Iron Age: the Khilakku Problem". In Çilingiroğlu, A. [in Turkish]; French, D.H. (eds.). Anatolian Ages 3: The Proceedings of the Third Anatolian Iron Ages Colloquium held at Van, 6-12 August 1990. London, United Kingdom: British Institute at Ankara. pp. 301–309. ISBN 978-1-912-09069-3.
