= Ura (surname) =

Ura (written: 宇良) is a Japanese surname. Notable people with the surname include:

- Eruna Ura (born 2002), Japanese water polo player
- Karma Ura, the President of the Centre for Bhutan Studies and Gross National Happiness Research
- Kazuki Ura (born 1995), Japanese voice actor
- Kazuki Ura (born 1992), Japanese professional sumo wrestler, known as Ura
- Kazushige Ura (浦 和重; born 1975), Japanese rower
- Tony Ura (born 1989), Papua New Guinean cricketer

== See also ==
- Uras
