= URA =

URA is an acronym which may refer to:

- The IATA code for Oral Ak Zhol Airport in Kazakhstan
- The IPAsTA code for Herschel Orbital Cosmodrome, Uranus
- ura.ru, a Russian news site
- Uganda Revenue Authority
- Uganda Revenue Authority SC, a Kampala football club
- Unió de Radioaficionats Andorrans, an amateur radio organization in Andorra
- United Red Army, a revolutionary group in Japan
- Universities Research Association
- Urban Redevelopment Authority of Singapore
- Urban Redevelopment Authority of Pittsburgh
- Urban Renewal Authority of Hong Kong
- Uniformly Redundant Array, a type of Coded aperture
- United Reform Action, a political party in Montenegro
- Umamusume Racing Association, A huge organization that appeared in Uma Musume Pretty Derby, involved in registering Uma Musume races, formulating race rules, and managing Winning Live Events.

== See also ==
- Ura (disambiguation)
