= Sammia gens =

The gens Sammia or Samia was an obscure plebeian family of equestrian rank at ancient Rome. Few members of this gens are mentioned in history, but a number are known from inscriptions.

== Praenomina ==
The main praenomina of the Sammii were Lucius and Sextus, to which they sometimes added other common names, including Gaius, Titus, and Quintus. There is also one example of the rare praenomen Tertius, perhaps indicative of the family's connection to Gaul, where unusual praenomina were fashionable.

== Branches and cognomina ==
There seems to have been a large family by this name at Nemausus in Gallia Narbonensis. They probably held a hereditary priesthood, as several of them bear the title of flamen or flaminica. Some of them bore the cognomen Aper, referring to a wild boar, and belonging to a common class of surnames derived from the names of familiar animals and objects.

== Members ==
This list includes abbreviated praenomina. For an explanation of this practice, see filiation.

- Samia, buried at Corduba in Hispania Baetica, aged fifty-one.
- Samius, an eques in the time of Claudius, sought the protection of Publius Suillius Rufus, at a time when Suillius was ruthlessly prosecuting various persons for supposed offenses against the emperor. After paying Suillius 400,000 sestertii, Samius learned that his counsel was in league with his enemies, and he fell on his sword in Suillius' house, in AD 47. This was one of the events that led to Suillius' downfall and banishment.
- Samius, built a second- or third-century monument at Acium in Sicily to his son, Ruber.
- Samius, named in an inscription from Ostia in Latium.
- Gaius Samius C. f., named in an inscription from Tegianum in Lucania, dating between 50 and 30 BC.
- Lucius Samius, named in an inscription from Rome.
- Lucius Sammius L. f. Aemilianus, a Flamen of Pan in Gallia Narbonensis, had also been prefect of a cohort of Spanish soldiers. Named in an inscription from Nemausus, together with his foster-son, Lucius Sammius Maternus, and Lucius Sammius Eutychus.
- Lucius Samius Agilis, dedicated a monument at Puteoli in Campania to his wife, Julia, aged about thirty-eight.
- Sextus Sammius Aper, patron of Sextus Sammius Macer, perhaps his freedman, for whom he dedicated a monument at Rome.
- Sextus Sammius Sex. f. Aper, a resident of Nemausus buried at Rome, had been one of the duumviri jure dicundo, a priest, and prefect of the vigiles.
- Sextus Sammius Apronianus, buried at Nemausus, with a monument from his mother, Sammia Helpizusa.
- Sammia Charitus, dedicated a monument at Nemausus to her husband, Lucius Julius Onesimus.
- Samia Chloe, buried at Rome, aged twenty-five.
- Samia Clementina, named in an inscription from Beneventum in Campania.
- Sammius T. f. Connius, the son of Titus Sammius Tertiolus, a scribe, and Connia Conniola.
- Gaius Samius Crescens, a soldier in the twelfth urban cohort, in the century of Maternus, buried at Mutina in Etruria, aged forty-two, having served for twenty-nine years, with a monument from his brother, Samius Fortis, dating to the second century.
- Sammius Cycnus, dedicated a tomb at Aquileia in Venetia and Histria to his foster-son, Sammius Sabinus.
- Sammia Emerita, dedicated tombs at Sitifis in Mauretania Caesariensis to her sons, Cornelius Noreius, aged sixteen, and Samalus Firmianus, aged fifty-six.
- Lucius Sammius Eutychus, named in the same inscription from Nemausus with Lucius Sammius Aemilianus and Lucius Sammius Maternus.
- Samius Fortis, a soldier in the eighth cohort of the Praetorian Guard, dedicated a monument at Mutina to his brother, Gaius Samius Crescens.
- Sammia Helpizusa, dedicated a monument at Nemausus to her son, Sextus Sammius Apronianus.
- Sammia Honorata, flaminica of Augustus, was buried at Rome, with a monument from her cousin.
- Tertius Sammius Karus, quaestor and decurion at Nemausus, buried in a family sepulchre with his wife, Sammia Atica, and son, Lucius Hortentius.
- Sammia Lais, buried at Nemausus, with a monument from her husband, Sextus Sammius Mercurialis.
- Sextus Sammius Macer, a freedman, perhaps of Sextus Sammius Aper, his patron, who built a tomb for Macer at Rome.
- Lucius Sammius Maternus, the foster-son of Lucius Sammius Aemilianus, named in an inscription from Nemausus, together with Lucius Sammius Eutychus.
- Sextus Sammius Mercurialis, dedicated a monument at Nemausus to his wife, Sammia Lais.
- Titus Sammius Passer, built a tomb at Tarnasicum in Noricum for himself and his wife, Eppaea Lucria.
- Lucius Sammius Perfectus, probably buried at Viminacium in Moesia Superior, had named Mercator and Macedonis, perhaps his freedmen, as his heirs.
- Sammia Placentina, buried at Vienna in Gallia Narbonensis, in the latter half of the second century, with a monument from her husband, Sammius Primitivus.
- Sammius Primitivus, dedicated a monument at Vienna to his wife, Sammia Placentina, dating to the later second century.
- Samius or Sammius Priscus, mentioned by Galen in De Remediis Parabilibus.
- Sammius Sabinus, buried at Aquileia, aged ten, with a monument from his foster-father, Sammius Cycnus.
- Sammia Sammiola, buried at Bellicum in Gallia Lugdunensis.
- Sextus Sammius Satyrninus, built a sepulchre at Rome for himself and his family.
- Sammia L. f. Secundina, flaminica of Augustus at Nemausus.
- Quintus Sammius Secundus, one of the quindecimviri sacris faciundis at Lugdunum in Gallia Lugdunensis in AD 160.
- Sextus Sammius Servatianus, built a monument at Nemausus.
- Sammia Q. f. Severina, flaminica of Augustus at Nemausus, where she was buried with a monument from her friend, Gaius Terentius Anicetus.
- Lucius Sammius L. f. Severus, buried at Nemausus, in a tomb built by his wife, Allia Rusticilla.
- Sextus Sammius Severus, a centurion in the first legion, had been a standard bearer for thirteen years, and was made centurion in AD 50.
- Sammia Su[...], buried at Lugdunum.
- Samia Ɔ. l. Tertia, a freedwoman named in an inscription from Rome.
- Titus Sammius Tertiolus, scriba of the public treasury, buried at Vienna, aged twenty-six, with a monument from his wife, Connia Conniola, and son, Sammius Connius.
- Sammius Tertullinus, made an offering to Hercules at Aeclanum in Samnium, dating to the first half of the third century.
- Sammius Victor, a centurion in the sixth legion, stationed in Britain.

== See also ==
- List of Roman gentes

== Bibliography ==
- Publius Cornelius Tacitus, Annales.
- Aelius Galenus (Galen), De Remediis Parabilibus (On Remedies Easy to Prepare).
- Dictionary of Greek and Roman Biography and Mythology, William Smith, ed., Little, Brown and Company, Boston (1849).
- Theodor Mommsen et alii, Corpus Inscriptionum Latinarum (The Body of Latin Inscriptions, abbreviated CIL), Berlin-Brandenburgische Akademie der Wissenschaften (1853–present).
- Bulletin Archéologique du Comité des Travaux Historiques et Scientifiques (Archaeological Bulletin of the Committee on Historic and Scientific Works, abbreviated BCTH), Imprimerie Nationale, Paris (1885–1973).
- René Cagnat et alii, L'Année épigraphique (The Year in Epigraphy, abbreviated AE), Presses Universitaires de France (1888–present).
- Pio Ciprotti, "Inscriptiones parietales Ostienses" (Inscriptions from the Walls of Ostia), in Studia et Documenta Historiae et Iuris, vol. 27, pp. 324–341 (1961).
- Fanou Papazoglou, Inscriptions de la Mésie Supérieure (Inscriptions of Moesia Superior, abbreviated IMS), Belgrade (1976–present).
