= Ura, Russia =

Ura (Russian: Ура) is the name of several rural localities in Russia.

Modern localities

- Ura, Republic of Tatarstan, a selo in Baltasinsky District of the Republic of Tatarstan
- Ura, Yaroslavl Oblast, a village in Shestikhinsky Rural Okrug of Nekouzsky District in Yaroslavl Oblast

Alternative names

- Ura, alternative name of Ura-Guba, a rural locality (a selo) in Kolsky District of Murmansk Oblast
