= Uras =

Uras may refer to:

== People ==
- Ali Uras (1923–2012), Turkish basketball player
- Cédric Uras (born 1977), French football player
- Güngör Uras (1933–2018), Turkish economist, journalist, academician and author
- Onur Uras (born 1985), Turkish olympic swimmer
- Ufuk Uras (born 1959), Turkish politician and economist

== Places ==
- Uras, Sardinia, village in the Province of Oristano, Italy

== Other ==
- Uras (mythology) or Urash, in Sumerian religion, goddess of earth, and one of the consorts of the sky god Anu
