= Ura, Anatolia =

Ura was a very important port on the east Mediterranean coast of the southern Anatolia, in the Late Bronze Age and Iron Age, probably located at the site of modern Silifke, or further west of Gilindere.

In the Late Bronze Age Ura belonged to the kingdom of Tarhuntassa.

Ura was the major port of Anatolia to which grain and goods were brought from Egypt and Canaan via Ugarit for transshipment to the Hittite Empire.

Ura is perhaps to be identified with the site of Soli (later Pompeiopolis). This city was founded by Greeks on the Mediterranean coast, in the 8th century BC.
