= Chatal Höyük (Amuq) =

Archaeological site in Turkey

Coordinates: 36.29770°N 36.54560°E

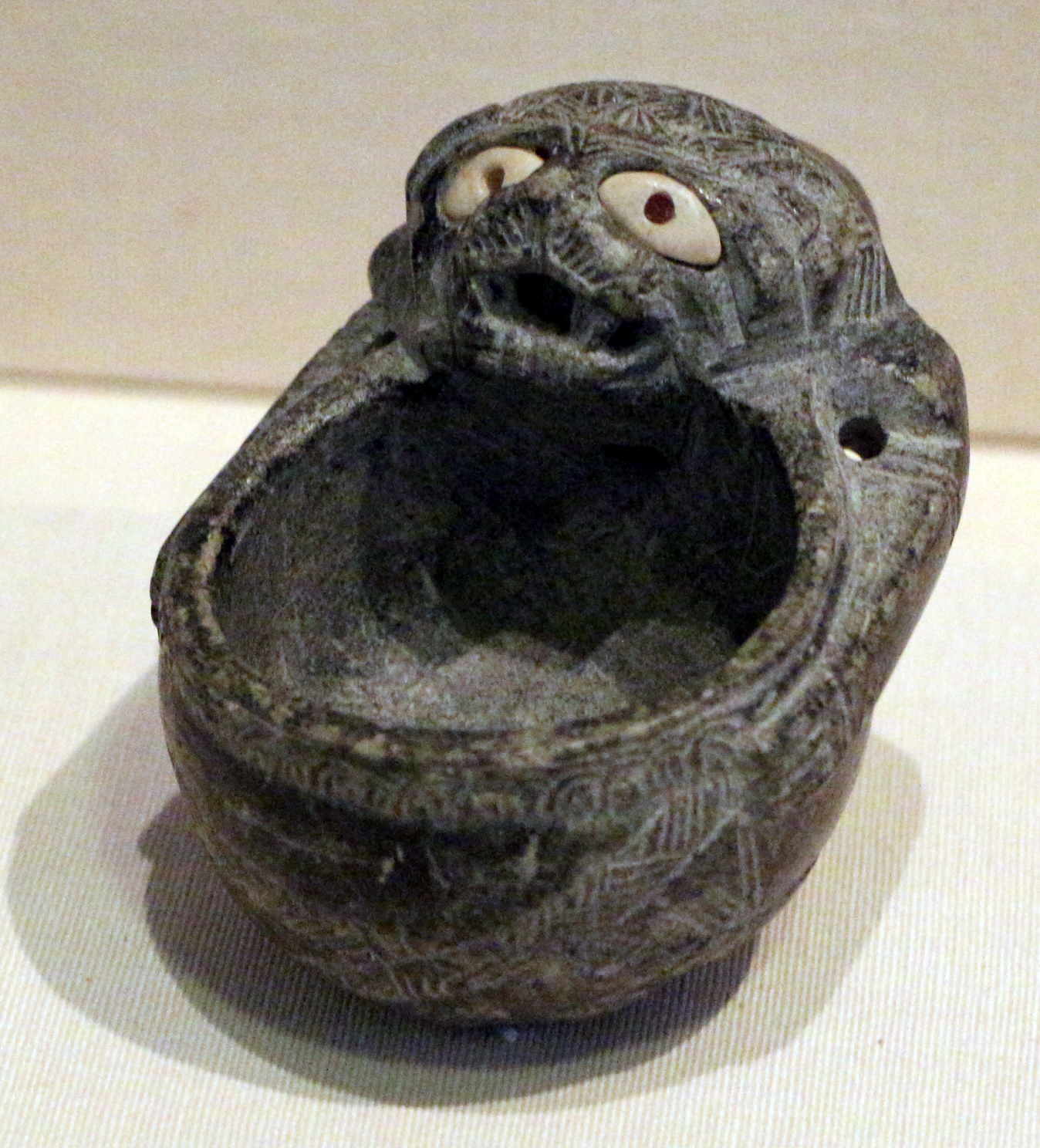
Libation bowl in the form of a lion's head from Chatal Hoyuk. 900-750 BC (Amuq Phase O) - Oriental Institute Museum, University of Chicago

Chatal Höyük (Amuq) is a large archaeological site in the eastern part of the Amuq plain in Turkey. It is located in the valley of the Orontes River, and it was inhabited from the late 4th millennium BCE, and until about 500 BC. It was a large town during the time of the Hittite Empire. In the Iron Age it was a part of the state of Unqi, based at the nearby site of Tell Tayinat.

Many other important archaeological sites are located in the area, such as Alalakh, Tell al-Judaidah, and Al-Mina.

The large acropolis of Chatal Höyük is located on the left bank of the Afrin river, and it was extensively investigated by archaeologists, while the nearby lower town still remained to be excavated. While the excavations of Chatal were very thorough, nevertheless, there were big delays with the publication of the results. Only in the 21st century the complete publication was achieved by the team headed by Marina Pucci.

== Excavations ==
Archaeologists Calvin W. McEwan and Robert J. Braidwood started their research in the Amuq valley in 1932 with the excavations at Chatal Höyuk and Tell al Judeidah. Originally, because of its large size, it was believed that Chatal Höyuk was the location of the ancient city of Kinalua (Khunalua), that was known from the textual sources in the Assyrian Annals. The Assyrians knew this area as 'the land of Pattina'. The excavations at Tell Tayinat started later in 1935, because no large public architecture was discovered at the other sites. At this time it is believed that Tell Tayinat is indeed the ancient Kinalua.

== See also ==
- Alalakh

== Bibliography ==
- R. C. Haines (1970). Excavations in the Plain of Antioch, Vol. II: "The Structural Remains of the Later Phases: Chatal Hüyük, Tell Al-Judaidah, and Tell Tayinat", Oriental Institute Publication 95, University of Chicago Press. ISBN 0-226-62198-7
- M. Pucci 2019, Excavations in the Plain of Antioch, Vol. 3. Stratigraphy, Pottery, and Small Finds from Chatal Höyük in the Amuq Plain, Oriental Institute Publications 143 (Chicago 2019).
- M. Pucci, S. Soldi, Going red in the Iron Age II. The emergence of Red-Slip pottery in northern Levant with specific reference to Tell Afs, Chatal Höyük and Zincirli Höyük, in: S. Valentini – G. Guarducci (eds.), Between Syria and the Highlands. Studies in Honor of Giorgio Buccellati & Marilyn Kelly-Buccellati, Studies on the Ancient Near East and the Mediterranean 3 (Rome 2019) 352–364.
- Marina Pucci 2008, CHATAL HÖYÜK PUBLICATION PROJECT. 2007–2008 ANNUAL REPORT 17
