= Ouled Djellal District =

Coordinates: 34°25′N 5°04′E

- District
- Country: Algeria
- Province: Ouled Djellal Province
- Time zone: UTC+1 (CET)

Ouled Djellal District is a district of Ouled Djellal Province, Algeria.

== Municipalities ==
The district has 3 municipalities:

- Ouled Djellal
- Ech Chaïba
- Doucen
