= Šuppiluliuma =

Šuppiluliuma may refer to:

- Šuppiluliuma I (14th century BC), king of the Hittites
- Šuppiluliuma II (12th century BC), king of the Hittites
- Šuppiluliuma (Pattin) (9th century BC), king of Pattin
- Šuppiluliuma (Kummuh) (8th century BC), king of Kummuh
