= Sidi Khaled =

Coordinates: 34°23′N 4°59′E

Sidi Khaled سيدي خالد
- Commune and town
- Country: Algeria
- Province: Ouled Djellal Province
- District: Sidi Khaled District

Area
  - Total: 8,210 sq mi (21,260 km^{2})

Population (2008)
  - Total: 38,987
- Time zone: UTC+1 (CET)

Sidi Khaled is a town and commune in Algeria. Before 2019, it was located in the province of Biskra, famous for its oasis and palms. As of 2019, it is located in Sidi Khaled District in Ouled Djellal Province. The name of Sidi Khaled is related to the Islamic personality Khaled bin Sinan.

== Geography ==
Sidi Khaled is located in Ouled Djellal Province, 100km south-east of the city of Biskra. It covers 212.60 km^{2} and has 38987 inhabitants (2008 census) with a density of 203.74 inhabitants per km^{2}. The French name of the city is Sidi Khaled. Nearby cities are:

- Arish Hamoula ~ 4 km
- Sidi Khaled Drissi Med ~ 6 km
- Chiaba ~ 6 km
- Difel ~ 10 km
- Besbes, Algeria ~ 10 km
- Ouled Djellal ~ 10 km
- Ferfad Ali ~ 15 km

== History ==
The town's name is derived from Sidi Khaled bin Sinan, the possibly legendary pre-Islamic figure who adhered to an Abrahamic religion. His tomb is said to be located near the city, inside the Sidi Khaled Mosque, which was built in 1917 over an older structure destroyed by the floods.

The city is the subject of many poems and legends, such as Hizia, which was composed in the 19th century by a local poet. The Sidi Khaled Mosque is also a popular destination for visit during the month of Ramadan.

== Economy ==
Sidi Khaled is located in a semi-arid region on the border of the Sahara Desert, with most people engaged in agro-pastoral vocation.
