= Sidi Khaled District =

Coordinates: 34°23′N 4°59′E

- District
- Country: Algeria
- Province: Ouled Djellal Province
- Time zone: UTC+1 (CET)

Sidi Khaled District is a district of Ouled Djellal Province, Algeria.

== Municipalities ==
The district has 3 municipalities:

- Sidi Khaled
- Ouled Harkat
- Ouled Sassi
