= Fertility rite =

Religious ritual intended to stimulate reproduction

Fertility rites are religious rituals that are intended to stimulate reproduction in humans or in the natural world. A group of people performing such rites is a fertility cult. Such rites may involve the sacrifice of "a primal animal, which must be sacrificed in the cause of fertility or even creation".

== Characteristics ==
"Fertility rites may occur in calendric cycles, as rites of passage within the life cycle, or as ad hoc rituals....Commonly fertility rituals are embedded within larger-order religions or other social institutions."

As with cave pictures "[that] show animals at the point of mating...[and] served magic fertility rites", such rites are "...a form of sympathetic magic" in which the forces of nature are to be influenced by the example acted out in the ritual. At times, "ceremonies intended to assure the fecundity of the earth or of a group of women...involve some form of phallic worship".

== Geographical varieties ==
=== Ancient Greece ===
Central to fertility rites in classical Greece was "Demeter, goddess of fertility... Her rites celebrated the procession of the seasons, the mystery of the plants and the fruits in their annual cycle of coming to be and passing away." But most "women's festivals... related in some way to woman's proper function as a fertile being (which allowed her to promote the fertility of crops too, by sympathy)".

Because of his link to the grape harvest, however, "it is not surprising to see Dionysus associated with Demeter and Kore in the Eleusinian Mysteries. For he, too, represented one of the great life-bringing forces of the world."

=== Phoenicia ===
Ancient Phoenicia saw "a special sacrifice at the season of the harvest, to reawaken the spirit of the vine"; while the winter fertility rite to restore "the spirit of the withering vine" included as sacrifice "cooking a kid in the milk of its mother, a Canaanite custom which Mosaic law condemned and formally forbade".

The death of Adonis – "a vegetation spirit who...was manifest in the seed of corn" – was marked by "the most beautiful of Phoenician festivals...celebrated immediately after the harvest".

=== Australia ===
Durkheim explored Australian ceremonies "to assure the prosperity of the animal or vegetable species serving the clan as totem". Such ceremonies took the form both of "oblations, whether bloody or otherwise", and of "rites which...consist in movements and cries whose object is to imitate the different aspects and attitudes of the animal whose reproduction is desired".

Durkheim concluded that "as the rites, and especially those which are periodical, demand nothing more of nature than that it follow its ordinary course, it is not surprising that it should generally have the air of obeying them".

=== Christian ===
In the parables of Jesus Christ, such as the Parable of the Sower, "the sower sows the word," where the seed is the word of God. The parables of the mustard seed and the growing seed explain the kingdom of God in which growth is due to God and not to man and follows its own schedule .

Many fertility rites that have spiritual origins such as European Christians and Pagans drew their methods from "myths, imagery, and ritual practices from the religions". Agricultural practices role in transforming “the wild” into habitable places were prevalent in (western). Alongside education and medicine, agriculture helped spread western power and influence through Christian missions.

=== Arabia ===
Some authors believe that fertility rites took place around the Kaaba in pre-Islamic times. During the autumn pilgrimage to the Kaaba, rituals performed there included performing the circumambulation naked, holding vigil in front of Mount Arafat, giving offerings to the pillars at al-Mina, and offering sacrifices. According to Barnaby Rogerson, it is likely these rituals were a part of a fertility cult, ensuring continuation of the life-cycle. In the cult, a mother goddess represented by a trinity was worshiped, along with a heroic young god would die and be reborn in an unending cycle due to his father, the supreme god. This was symbolized by agriculture and movement of the celestial bodies in Arabia. Allat was the fertility goddess with al-Rabba (the sovereign), Manat and Al-Uzza being her epithets. Thuraiza or Muzdalifah was the heroic young god and Allah was the father. Benjamin Walker says the Kaaba was honored by orgies and that its name means "virgin". Fertility rites took place in the temples of the Great Goddess and the color green was associated with her.

=== Islamic traditions ===
It is believed in some Islamic traditions that a tree transfers its blessings (barakah) and thus trees were planted on graves. The custom of beating people with twigs is derived from an old fertility rite, with the tree transferring its life force. This practice was performed in medieval Egypt, particularly in Cairo by a jester called the 'Ifrit al-mahmal, when the mahmal carrying the covering of the Kaaba was exhibited. A similar practice also happens in the Deccan region of India during Muharram. Pilgrims to Mecca and tombs of saints are also garlanded since it is believed they preserve the life force of a tree.

=== Mesoamerica ===
Agricultural fertility was and continues to be of primary concern for Mesoamerican cultures. Many ritual activities performed by Indigenous communities in Mesoamerica were directed to deities of land and rain, as their understanding of fertility was intimately related to specific geographical attributes, such as bodies of water, mountains, and caves. In Mesoamerican worldview, agricultural success was believed to be directly related to survival and prosperity. For this reason, ceremonies and religious rites offered to rain and earth deities were an integral part of most aspects of their socioreligious organization. Archaeological evidence throughout Mesoamerica attests to the magnanimous importance of fertility rituals for the Olmec, Maya, and Aztec civilizations.

== See also ==
- Descent to the underworld
- Hieros gamos
- Khalid Nabi Cemetery
- Life-death-rebirth deity
- List of fertility deities
- Obando Fertility Rites
- Beltane
- Maypole
- Mother goddess
- Phallic processions
- Sacred prostitution
- Sparagmos
