= Sidi Khaled Mosque =

Mosque in Biskra, Algeria

- مسجد سيدي خالد
- The rebuilt mosque, in 2006

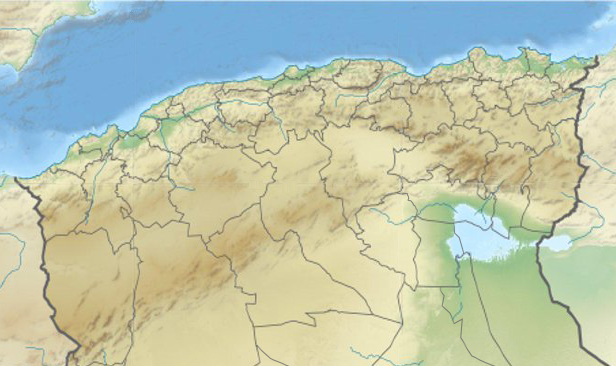
- Location of the mosque in northern Algeria

Religion
- Affiliation: Sunni Islam
- Sect: Sufism
- Ecclesiastical or organisational status: Mausoleum; Mosque
- Status: Active

Location
- Location: Sidi Khaled, Ouled Djellal, Biskra Province
- Country: Algeria
- Interactive map of Sidi Khaled Mosque
- Coordinates: 34°23′10″N 5°00′39″E

Architecture
- Type: Islamic architecture
- Style: Algerian
- Completed: Prior to the 16th century; 1917 (current form)

Specifications
- Dome: 7
- Minaret: 1
- Shrine: 1: (Khaled bin Sinan)

The Sidi Khaled Mosque (Arabic: مسجد سيدي خالد; French: Mosquée de Sidi Khaled) is a mosque and mausoleum located in the town of Sidi Khaled in the district of Ouled Djellal, in the province of Biskra, Algeria. It is one of Algeria's national heritage sites.

The mosque is believed to contain the tomb of Khaled bin Sinan, an early pre-Islamic religious figure who was said to have been the descendant of Ishmael. Local traditions assert that he was buried in Algeria, although this is mostly legendary fiction.

== History ==
The Sidi Khaled Mosque is said to have been one of the oldest mosques in Algeria. The Algerian scholar, Abdur-Rahman al-Akhdari, visited a tomb dedicated to Khalid bin Sinan that was located in Biskra. He also composed a poem about Khalid bin Sinan upon his visit to the tomb. Some historians, however, have doubted the authenticity of the poem and whether it can be attributed to Al-Akhdari. Nevertheless, Al-Akhdari is credited as being the first to write about the tomb, and is sometimes attributed to even be the founder of the tomb. The traveller Al-Ayyashi wrote about the tomb in 1668 CE, describing it as being located inside a large mosque that was attached to a madrasah.

=== Modern history ===
In 1912, the incoming floods destroyed the mosque and its mausoleum. Five years later, the residents of Biskra rebuilt the mausoleum, with the help of prominent architects. In 1999, the mosque and its mausoleum were classified as a national heritage monument of Algeria. The present-day structure is the 1917 reconstruction, with an additional six years to complete the rest of the building.

In recent times, the mosque was placed under a restoration project by the Ministry of Culture due to it suddenly being a deteriorating state, such as cracks appearing in the walls. However, the project was delayed, and put on hold. As of 2021, the project was delayed and no further updates were given, and it was also reported that the roof was in danger of collapsing. Regardless, this place is still a popular destination amongst the locals of Biskra, who visit it usually on the 26th day of the month of Ramadan.

== Gallery ==
The minaret of the mosque

Minaret when viewed from inside the courtyard

Inside the mosque courtyard

The mosque during a sandstorm

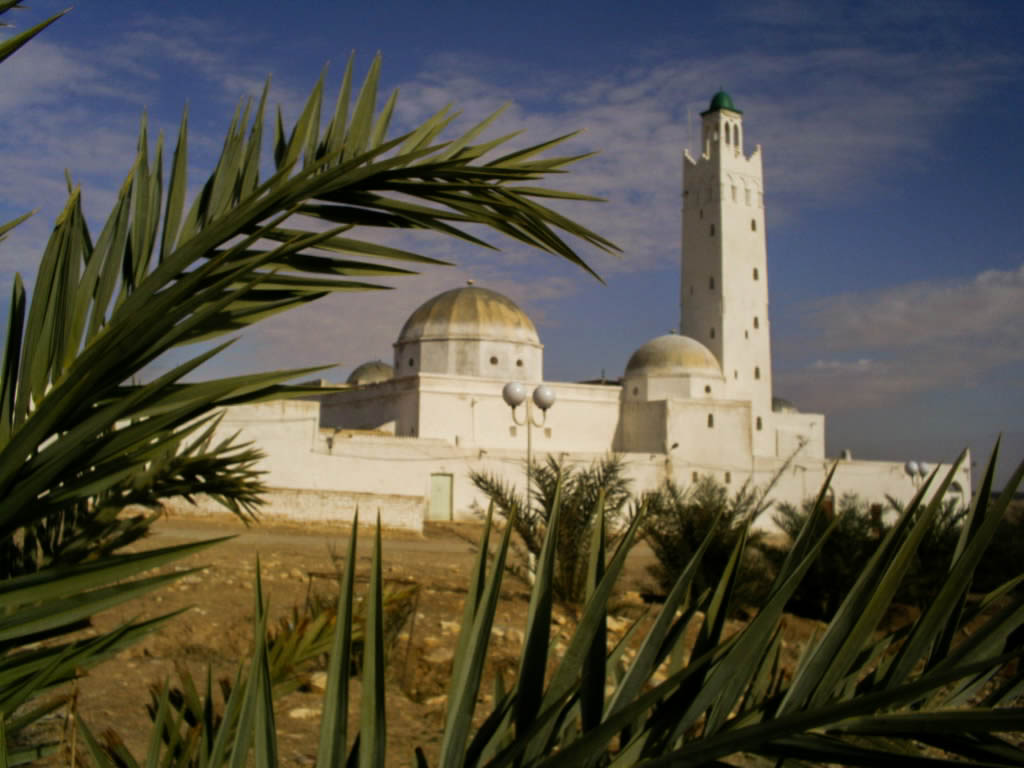

== See also ==
- Islam in Algeria
- List of mosques in Algeria
- List of cultural assets in Biskra Province
