= Halparuntiya II =

Neo-Hittite king

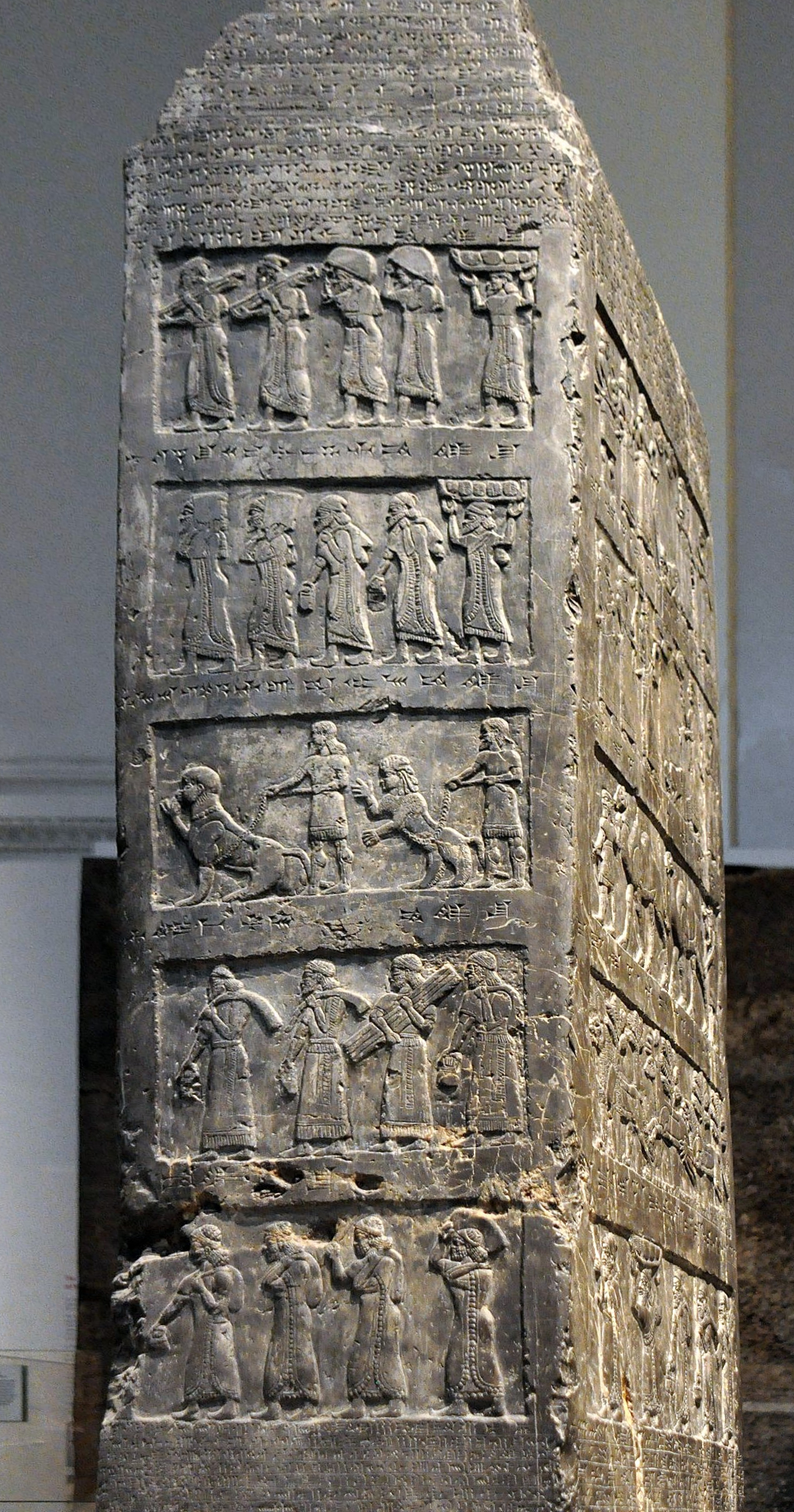
The Black Obelisk of Shalmaneser III, Halparuntiya's delegation is depicted on the bottom row.

Halparuntiya II of Pattin (Neo-Assyrian Akkadian: Qalparunda), was a Neo-Hittite king of the city-state of Tell Tayinat, capital of the kingdom of Pattin, between 857 and 853 BC.

Halparuntiya came to the throne after the defeat of Suppiluliuma, who was defeated by the Assyrians. The Assyrian king, Shalmaneser III, made Pattin into an Assyrian tributary, and Halparuntiya sent tribute in 857 and 853 BC. Tribute bearers of Halparuntiya are depicted on the Black Obelisk of Shalmaneser III, alongside those of Jehu, king of Israel.

Preceded by Suppiluliuma	King of Pattin c. 857 - 853 BC	Succeeded by Lubarna II
