= Tou (biblical figure) =

Biblical king of Hamath

King Tou or Toi is the name of a biblical king of Hamath, an ancient city located in Syria. He is referred to in 2 Samuel 8:9–10 as "Toi" (תעי Tō‘î) and 1 Chronicles 18:9–10 as "Tou" (תעו Tō‘ū). Both biblical accounts state that Tou paid homage to David, king of Israel, because he had defeated the army of Tou's enemy, Hadadezer, king of Zobah.

== Biblical text (NRSV) ==
2 Samuel 8:9–10 reads:

9 When King Toi of Hamath heard that David had defeated the whole army of Hadadezer, 10 Toi sent his son Joram to King David, to greet him and to congratulate him because he had fought against Hadadezer and defeated him. Now Hadadezer had often been at war with Toi. Joram brought with him articles of silver, gold, and bronze;

1 Chronicles 18:9–10 reads:

9 When King Tou of Hamath heard that David had defeated the whole army of King Hadadezer of Zobah, 10 he sent his son Hadoram to King David, to greet him and to congratulate him because he had fought against Hadadezer and defeated him. Now Hadadezer had often been at war with Tou. He sent all sorts of articles of gold, of silver, and of bronze;

== Context ==
According to biblical studies professor Gershon Galil, "the Empire of David is a realistic historical phenomenon and the biblical description of its formation and consolidation is possible and reasonable ... Eight inscriptions recently discovered at different sites clearly indicate that a large kingdom named Palistin existed in northwestern Syria and southern Turkey. This is the reference to the ancient kingdom of Palistin, recently proposed by several scholars, which encompassed the cities Hamath, Aleppo and Carchemish," Prof. Galil says. "This kingdom was inhabited by different groups including Sea Peoples. They invaded the Levant in the 12th century BC, conquered vast areas, destroyed kingdoms and took over their lands." Gilil notes that "some of these inscriptions open with the words 'I am Tai(ta) the Hero, King of Palistin'. Given our philological and historical knowledge, it's clear that Tai(ta) should be identified with Toi, mentioned in the Book of Samuel and in Chronicles."

Palistin was one of the Syro-Hittite states which emerged in Syria after the Late Bronze Age collapse. It dates to at least the 11th century BC and is known primarily through the inscriptions of its king Taita and his wife.
