= Ouled Djellal Province =

Province of Algeria

Ouled Djellal Province ولاية أولاد جلال
- Province
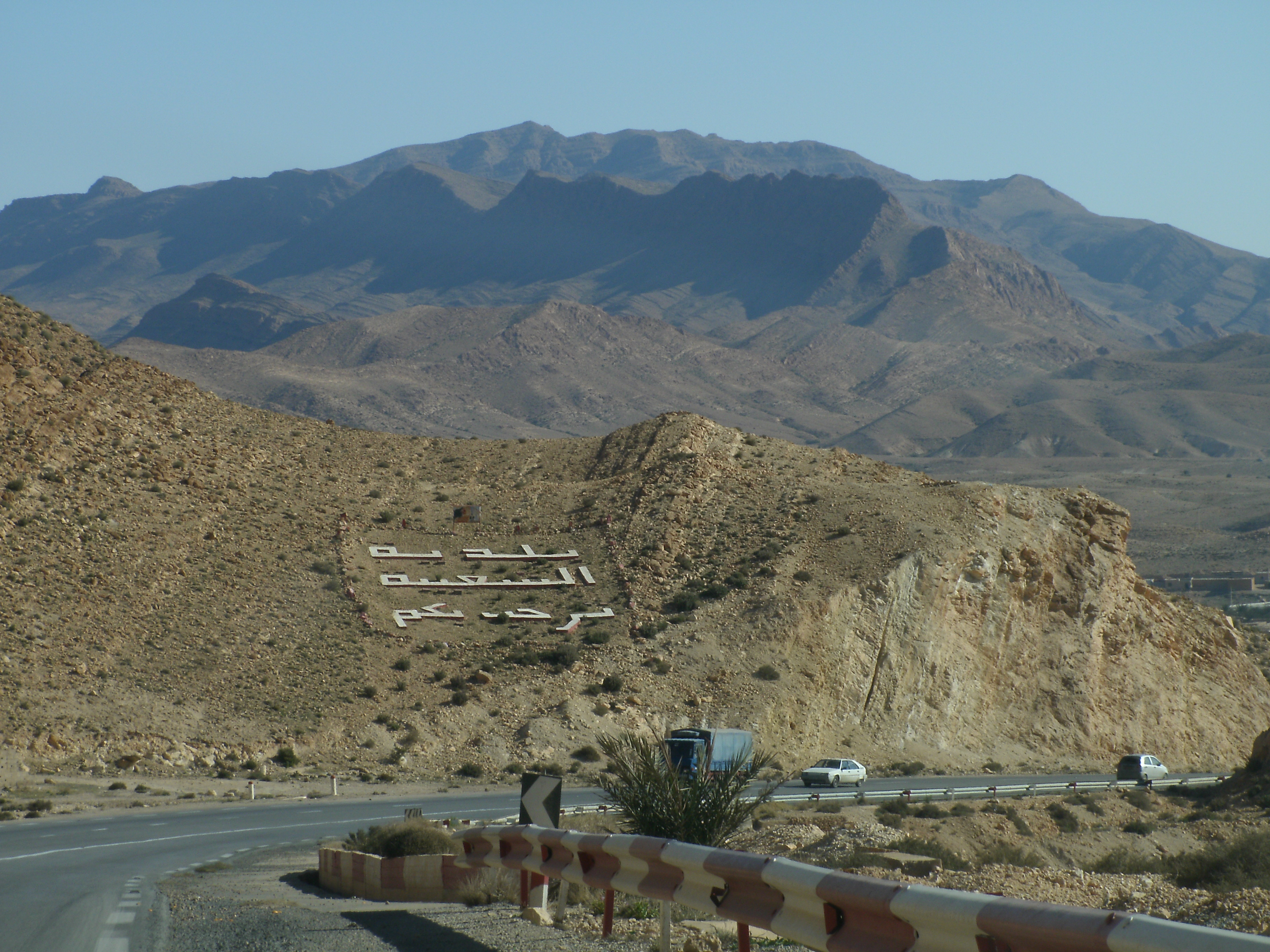

- Map of Algeria highlighting Ouled Djellal
- Coordinates: 34°26′00″N 5°04′00″E
- Country: Algeria
- Capital: Ouled Djellal

Area
  - Total: 11,410 km^{2} (4,410 sq mi)
- Elevation: 276 m (906 ft)

Population (2008)
  - Total: 174,219
  - Density: 15.27/km^{2} (39.55/sq mi)
- Time zone: UTC+01 (CET)
- Area code: +213 (0) 49
- ISO 3166 code: DZ-51
- Districts: 2
- Municipalities: 6

The wilaya of Ouled Djellal is an Algerian province created in 2019, previously, a delegated wilaya created in 2015. It is in the Algerian Sahara.

== Geography ==
The wilaya of Ouled Djellal is located in the Algerian Sahara, its area 131,220 km² .

It is delimited by:

- to the north by the M'sila Province;
- to the east by the Biskra Province and El M'Ghair Province;
- to the west by the Djelfa Province;
- and to the south by the Ouargla Province.

== History ==
The wilaya of Ouled Djellal was created on November 26, 2019 .

Previously, it was a delegated wilaya, created according to the law n° 15–140 of May 27, 2015, creating administrative districts in certain wilayas and fixing the specific rules related to them, as well as the list of municipalities that are attached to it. Before 2019, it was attached to the Biskra Province.

== Organization of the wilaya ==
During the administrative breakdown of 2015, the delegated wilaya of Ouled Djellal was made up of 3 communes and 2 Districts. As of 2019, it consists of 2 districts and 6 communes.

=== Districts ===
- Ouled Djella
- Sidi Khaled

=== Communes ===
- Ouled Djellal
- Sidi Khaled
- Ouled Sassi
- Ouled Harkat
- Ech Chaïba
- Doucen
