= Lubarna II =

Lubarna II (or Labarna II) was the ruler of the Syro-Hittite state of Pattin, also called Unqi, until 831, or 829 BC.

The name Lubarna was the Luwian iteration of the Hittite royal title "Labarna," which was held by the kings of the Hittite Empire. Thus, Lubarna's name seems to hearken back to the power of the Hittites in the Bronze Age. There was an earlier Pattinite king who had this regnal name, contemporary to Ashurnasirpal II of Assyria.

Pattin, during the time of Lubarna, was a tributary to the Neo-Assyrian Empire. Lubarna's apparent predecessor, Halparuntiya II, sent tribute to the Assyrian Great King, Shalmaneser III. It is very likely then, that Lubarna was appointed as a vassal ruler by the king of Assyria. In 831, however, Lubarna was assassinated by his subjects for being too pro-Assyrian, and replaced by a usurper named Surri.

Preceded by Halparuntiya II	King of Pattin c. 853 BC - 831/829 BC	Succeeded by Surri
