= Khaled bin Sinan =

Semi-legendary monotheist in pre-Islamic Arabia

- خالد بن سنان
- The historic Sidi Khaled Mosque in Biskra, Algeria, which is believed by the locals to contain the tomb of Khaled bin Sinan.
- Born: c. 520 CE; Al Yamama
- Died: Before 630 CE; Arabian Peninsula (Sidi Khaled village in Algerian tradition, Golestan in Shi'ite tradition)
- Monuments: Sidi Khaled Mosque at Biskra, Algeria; Khalid Nabi Cemetery in Golestan province, Iran

Khaled bin Sinan al-'Absi (Arabic: خالد بن سنان العبسي) was a semi-legendary historical figure from the Banu Abs tribe and a Prophet claimant living on the Arabian Peninsula, a generation before Muhammad. He is the earliest known historical Prophet claimant from pre-Islamic Arabia who, like Muhammad, fought paganism and preached monotheism to his people in the Hejaz. Many details about the life of Khaled are disputed in Islamic sources, such as the location of his tomb or whether he was a true or false Prophet.

In Islamic tradition, the legacy of Khaled is defined by three legendary miracles. The most famous was his extinguishing the Nar al-Harratayn, a catastrophic volcanic fire or inferno that rose from a cave to threaten his region. He was also credited for saving his people from a monstrous and mythical bird of prey that snatched up livestock and children, by praying to God to strike down the species down into extinction. His final famous feat was his deathbed prophecy, where he instructed his sons to exhume his corpse three days after his burial once they spotted a specific animal herding sheep around his grave, promising that he would temporarily resurrect to reveal the secrets of the past and the future. While the animal appeared, as he predicted, his sons aborted Khaled's commands out of fear for the tribal mockery that would result from them exhuming his corpse.

Khaled continues to be revered in the present day by some Muslim populations, especially in North Africa. There are at least five locations across the Muslim world that are believed to have his grave: Gorgan in Iran, Manbij in Syria, Biskra in Algeria, Tebessa in Algeria, and a site near Kairouan in Tunisia. In Algeria, one town, Sidi Khaled, is named after Khalid, and the community at this town believes that the local Sidi Khaled Mosque, which is one of Algeria's national heritage sites, has the tomb of Khaled. This mosque had, in some periods of Islamic history, become pilgrimage destination.

== Ancestry ==
Genealogists including Ibn al-Kalbi have attributed Khaled bin Sinan as being a descendant of Adnan through the Banu Abs branch of the Ghatafan, hence making Khaled an Adnanite of the Qays 'Aylan tribal group. His full lineage was given as; Khalid, son of Sinan, son of Ghaith, son of Maritah, son of Makhzum, son of Rabi'ah, son of 'Aws, son of Malik, son of Ghalib, son of Qutay'ah, son of 'Abs, son of Baghid, son of Rayth, son of Ghatafan.

And from Ghatafan, his lineage is traced back to Adnan: Ghatafan, son of Sa'd, son of Qays 'Aylan, son of Mudar, son of Nizar, son of Ma'ad, son of Adnan. Genealogists, while they agreed that Adnan was descended from Ishmael, differed on how many fathers there were between Adnan and Ishmael; hence Khalid bin Sinan was an Ishmaelite but with uncertain lineage. (Note: As seen in the cited works; Ibn al-Kalbi, Ibn Kathir and Baladhuri disagree on how the lineage of Adnan can lead back to Ishmael. This is explained in Safiur Rahman Mubarakpuri's work.)

== Time period ==
Muhammad Shafi places Khaled bin Sinan as existing before the coming of Jesus. Ibn Kathir, however, places Khaled as existing in the 6th century CE, being born 50 years before the Year of the Elephant event. As the event has been dated to circa 570, it means Khaled was born around the 520s. Khaled's daughter lived contemporary to the Sasanian ruler Khosrow I (c. 531–579).

== Prophethood ==
=== Dispute of prophethood ===
There is a dispute whether Khaled was considered to be a prophet or not in the Islamic tradition. Ibn Arabi considered Khaled to have been a prophet, but not a messenger. Majlisi stated in Bihar al-Anwar that Khaled was "most likely" a prophet. Some Islamic scholars have also transmitted narrations of Khaled having a status as being a prophet who was forgotten by his people, but these narrations are of disputed authenticity. There are also narrations where Khaled is identified as being the prophet sent to the Companions of the Rass that are mentioned in the Qur'an. Ibn Babawayh states that Khaled was a minor prophet whose prophethood "should not be denied" by Muslims.

Ibn Kathir disagreed that Khaled was a prophet, citing a Hadith where Muhammad himself narrated that there was no prophet that appeared between him and Jesus. Al-Jahiz also agrees that Khaled did not receive prophethood, bringing up the point that the prophets in Islam were usually from the people of cities and towns, while Khaled was a desert-dwelling and nomadic Bedouin.

=== Prophetic miracles ===
Muslim scholars have transmitted narrations and traditions regarding miracles that Khaled allegedly performed during his lifetime as a prophet. One of such traditions was Khaled, a preacher of Judaic monotheism, being sent to destroy a large fire which was worshipped by the Arabs who professed Zoroastrianism. Another tradition cites Khaled as being able to stop a large man-eating avian beast by faithful prayers to God.

One of the transmitters of the stories was Al-Mu'alla ibn al-Mahdi. The authenticity of Al-Mu'alla was criticized by Nur al-Din al-Haythami and Abu Hatim, the latter also noted that Al-Mu'alla generally brought unsound narrations. Ibn Kathir affirms that the story of Khaled and the fire is disputed, but attributes its chain of narration to Ibn Abbas and then adds on that the story is not reliable evidence of Khaled's prophethood.

== Historicity ==
Ella Laundau-Tasseron has found that many of the fantastical and miraculous stories attributed to Khalid are constructed out of highly structure, religious and literary motifs adapted from biblical, Near Eastern, and Arabian folklore.

While much of Khaled's story is therefore legendary, Christian J. Robin has argued that Khaled ibn Sinan himself was a real historical figure: he belonged to a minor tribe of Central Arabia, he was not the leader of his community, and he is the only pre-Islamic Arabian Prophet-claimant whose people were not destroyed. Therefore, Robin argues, Khaled in essence does not fit the mold of a legendary Arabian prophet and was likely a real person, even if little about his life can be known beyond his pre-Islamic monotheistic proclamations.

== Burial place ==
There are two burial places attributed to Khaled bin Sinan. Yomut tradition narrates that he was buried in Iran where the Khaled Nabi Cemetery named after him now stands.

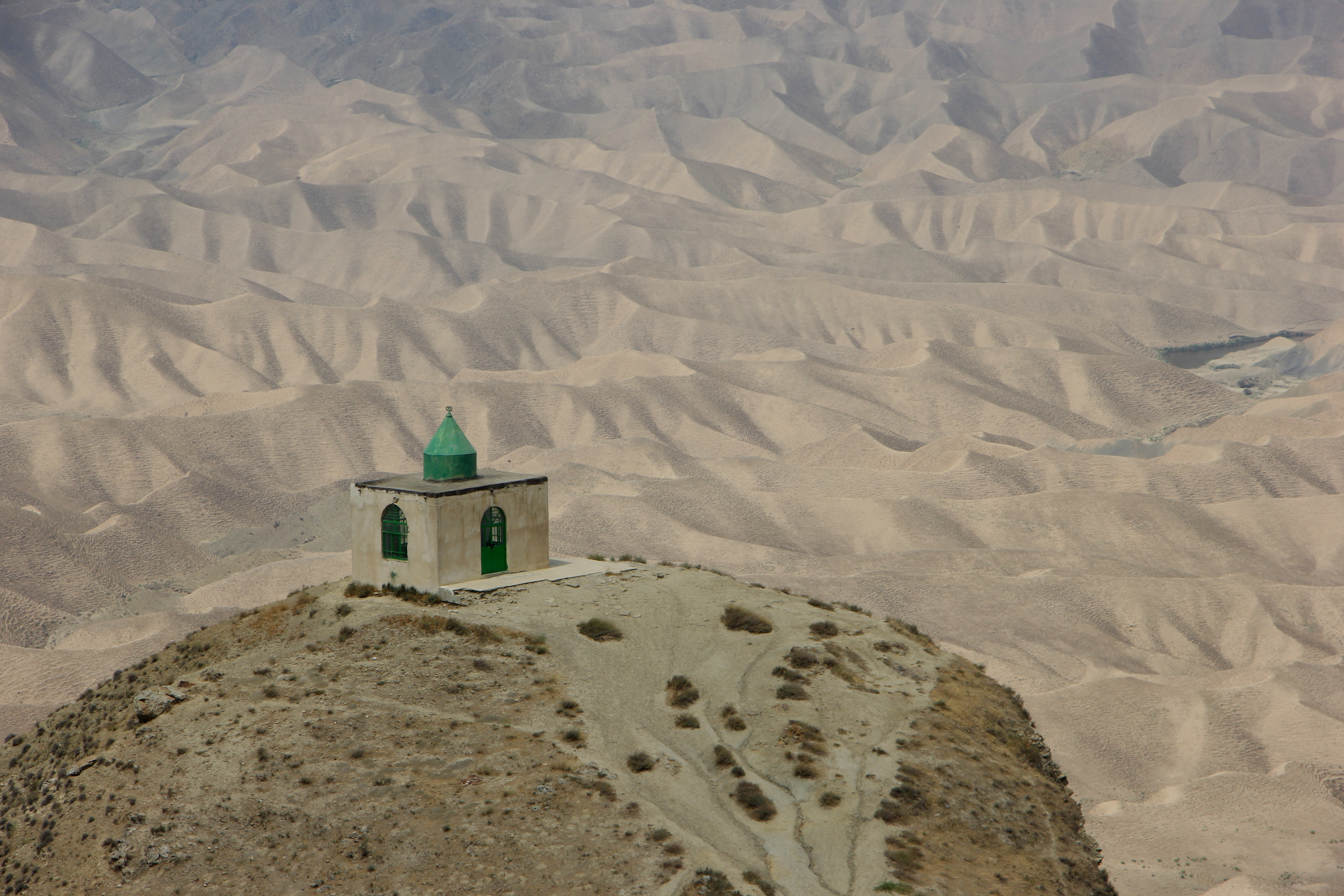
The mausoleum of Khaled bin Sinan, on the top of a mountain at the edge of the Khalid Nabi Cemetery in Golestan province, Iran.

Algerian Islamic traditions, such as those transmitted by 'Abd al-Rahman al-Akhdari, state that Khaled was buried in Biskra, Algeria where the Sidi Khaled Mosque now stands. The current building is a modern 1917 restoration of the original building that was destroyed by flooding.

== See also ==
- Monotheism in pre-Islamic Arabia
- List of Islamic prophets

== Sources ==
- Landau-Tasseron, Ella (1997). "Unearthing a Pre-Islamic Arabian Prophet" (PDF). Jerusalem Studies in Arabic and Islam. 21. Hebrew University of Jerusalem: 42–61.
- Robin, Christian J. (2012). "Les signes de la prophétie en Arabie à l'époque de Muḥammad (fin du VIe et début du VIIe siècle de l'ère chrétienne)". In Piettre, Renee; Schmidt, Francis (eds.). La raison des signes. Brill. pp. 433–476.
