= Ouled Sassi =

Coordinates: 34°11′05″N 4°26′58″E

- Commune and town
- Interactive map of Ouled Sassi
- Country: Algeria
- Province: Ouled Djellal Province
- District: Sidi Khaled District
- Time zone: UTC+1 (CET)

Ouled Sassi or Ras El Miaad was a town and commune in Biskra Province, Algeria, prior to the 2019 redistribution. As of 2019, it is located in Sidi Khaled District in Ouled Djellal Province.
