= Doucen =

- Commune and town
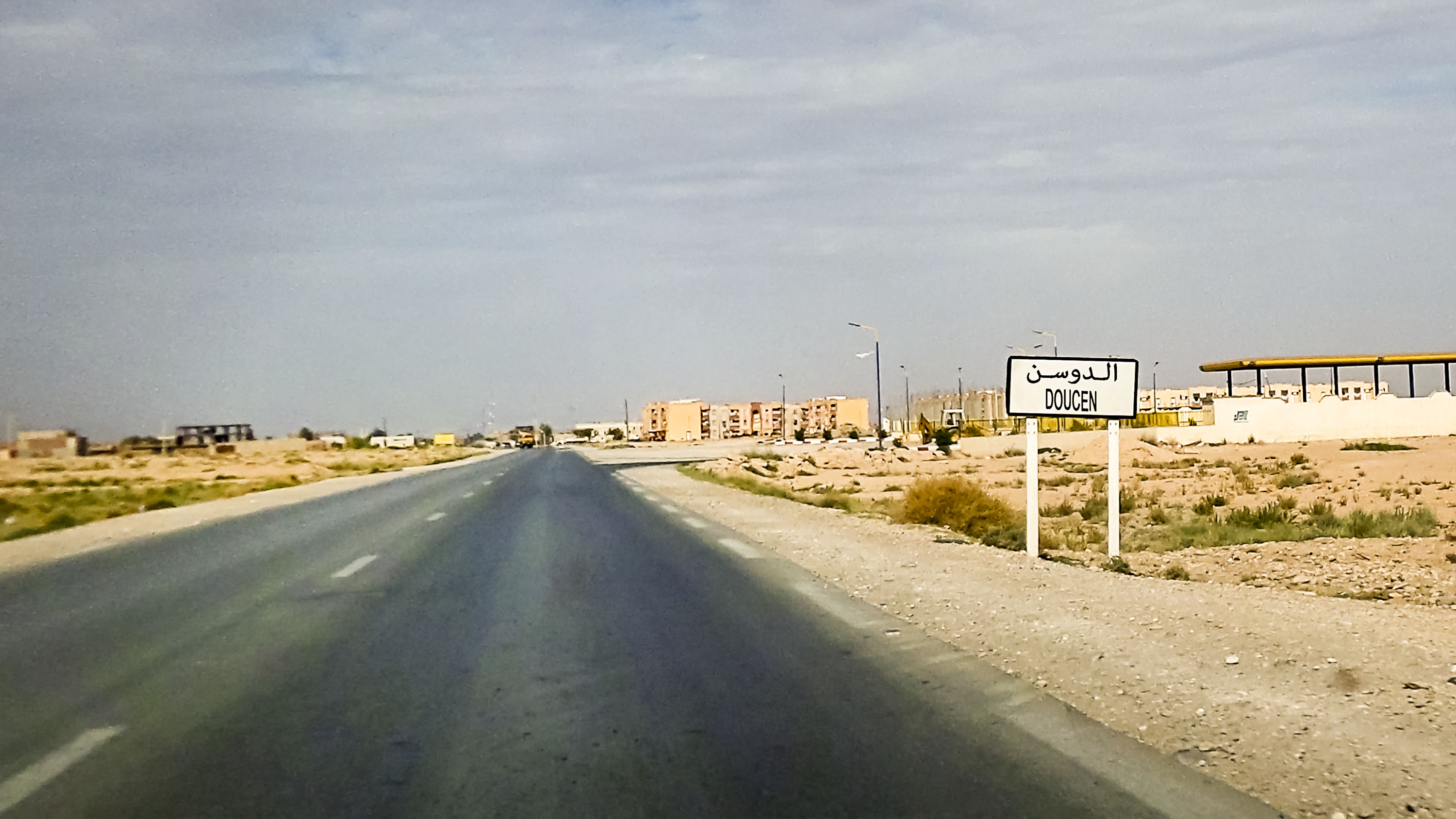
- Doucen commune

- Location within Algeria
- Country: Algeria
- Province: Ouled Djellal Province
- District: Ouled Djellal District
- Time zone: UTC+1 (CET)

Doucen is a town and commune in Ouled Djellal Province, Algeria. Up until 2019, it was a commune of Biskra Province.
