= Suppiluliuma II of Pattin =

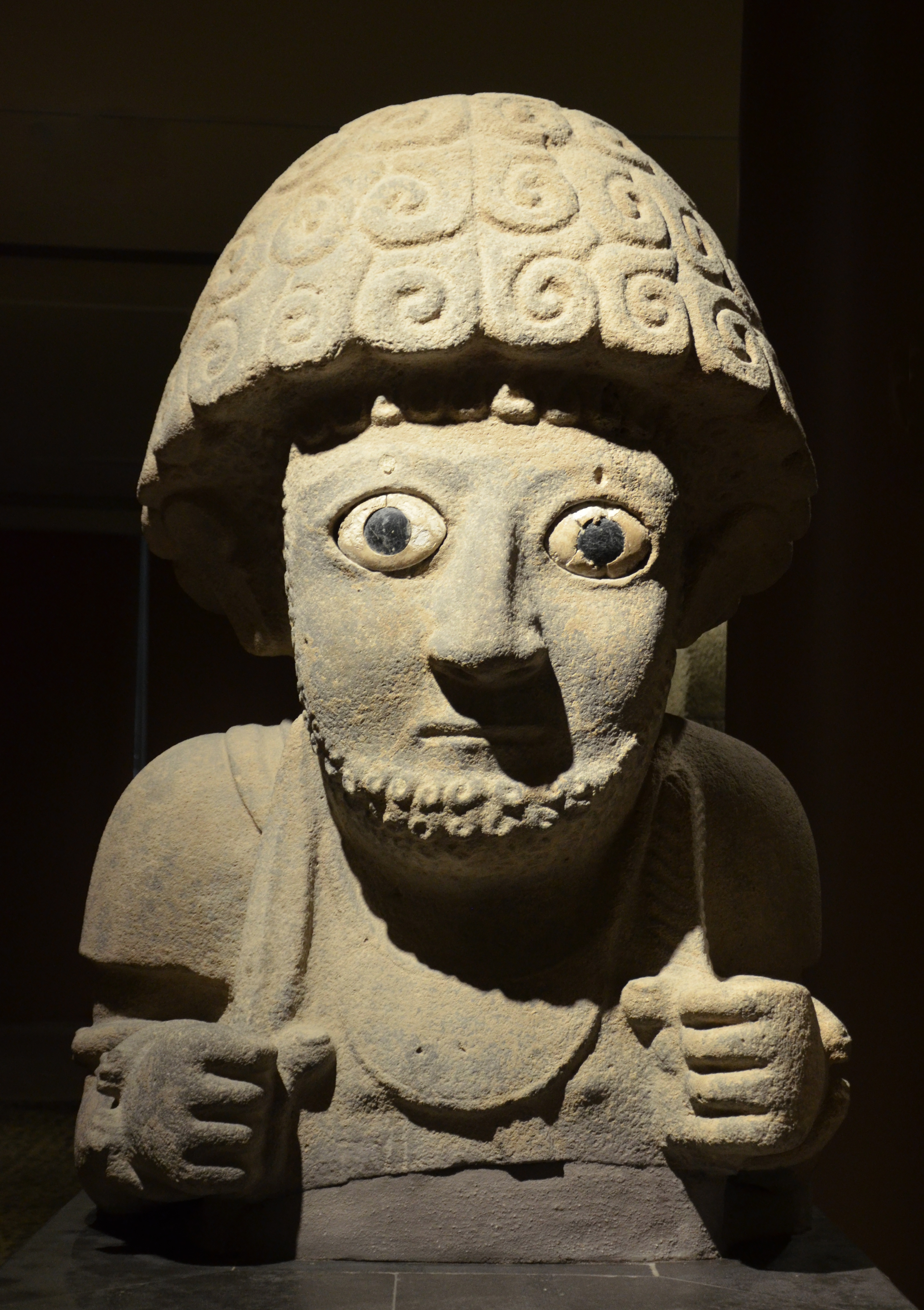
Statue from Tell Tayinat

Suppiluliuma (Assyrian: Sapalulme), possibly Suppiluliuma II or III, was the king of the Neo-Hittite state of Pattin in the mid-ninth century BC.

In 858 BC, Suppiluliuma entered into an alliance with the other Neo-Hittite states Bit-Adini, Carchemish and Samʾal against the Neo-Assyrian king Shalmaneser III. They were defeated near Lutibu. In 858 or 857, Shalmaneser crossed the Orontes into the territory of Pattin. With the Assyrians threatening the fortified city of Alimush (Alishir), Suppiluliuma called upon the alliance. The four allies were joined on this occasion by the states of Adanawa, Hilakku, Yahan and Yasbuq. Shalmaneser inflicted a second defeat on the coalition near Alimush. Suppiluliuma was in command at this second battle, but his fate is unknown. His reign, however, came to an end. His successor, Halparuntiya, paid tribute to Assyria in 857 and 853.

In 2012, a large statue with a fragmentary inscription in Hieroglyphic Luwian was discovered at the site of the Pattinite capital in Tell Tayinat. The statue is identified as Suppiluliuma, but his kingdom is not mentioned in the surviving inscription. It may belong to an earlier king of Pattin of the same name. The king defeated in 858 may well have been the second or third Suppilulium of Pattin. The fragmentary inscription is in the style of Assyrian royal inscriptions, such as those of Shalmaneser celebrating his victories over Suppiluliuma. The statue claims that Suppiluliuma seized eight regions from an enemy, put up something (possibly a monument) along his frontier and did something undecipherable to a hundred towns.

== Bibliography ==
- Bryce, Trevor (2012). The World of the Neo-Hittite Kingdoms: A Political and Military History. Oxford University Press.
- Weeden, Mark (2013). "After the Hittites: The Kingdoms of Karkamish and Palistin in Northern Syria" (PDF). Bulletin of the Institute of Classical Studies. 56 (2): 1–20. doi:10.1111/j.2041-5370.2013.00055.x. JSTOR 44254129.
- Weeden, Mark (2023). "The Iron Age States of Central Anatolia and Northern Syria". In Karen Radner; Nadine Moeller; D. T. Potts (eds.). The Oxford History of the Ancient Near East. Vol. IV: The Age of Assyria. Oxford University Press. pp. 912–1026. doi:10.1093/oso/9780190687632.003.0046.
