= Khalid Nabi Cemetery =

Cemetery in Iran

Coordinates: 37.741747°N 55.410983°E

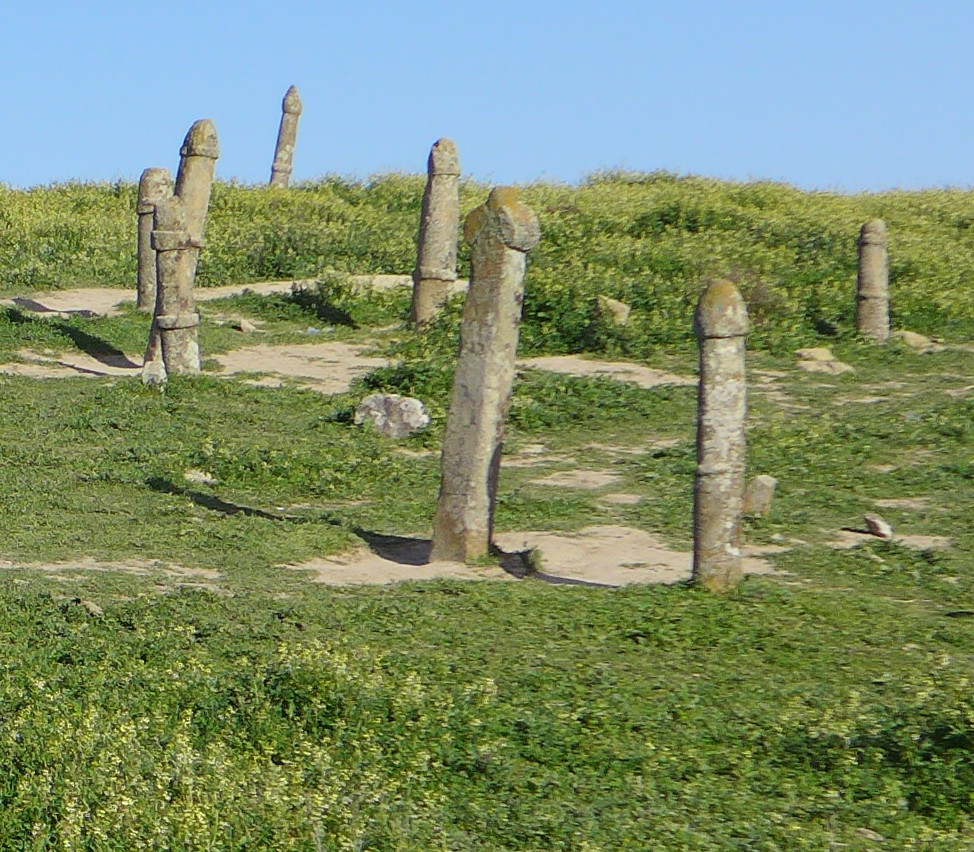
Gravestones at Khalid Nabi Cemetery - mostly Stronach type 1 and one long type 2

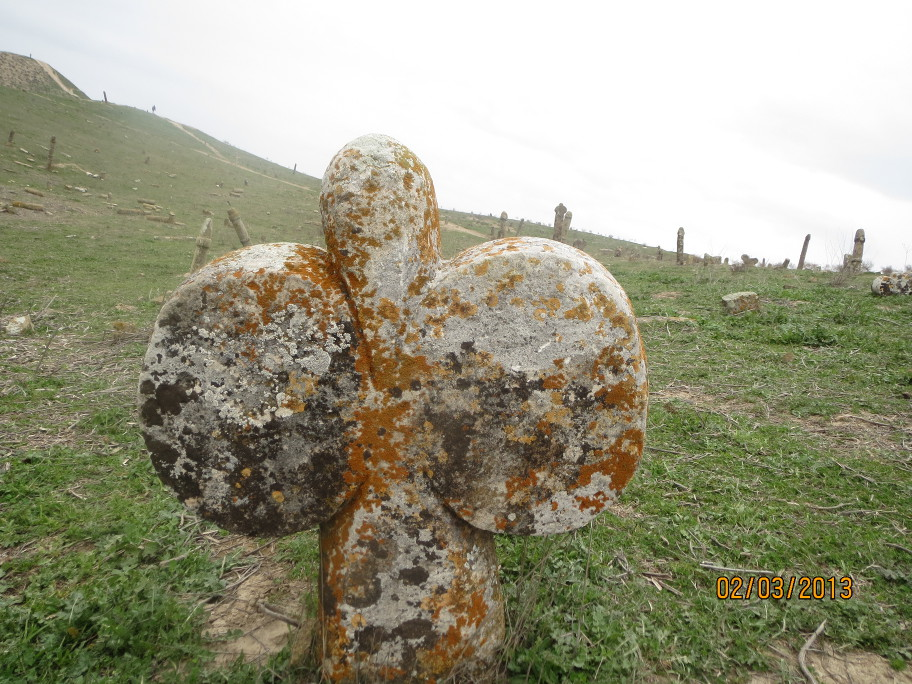
Rounded "type 2" gravestone at Khaled Nabii cemetery

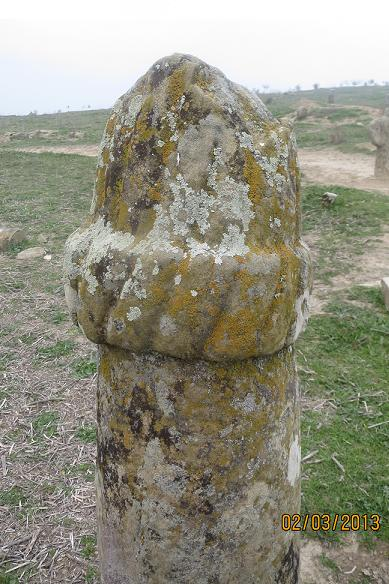
Pillar "type 1" gravestone at Khaled Nabi with cap/turban top

Khalid Nabi Cemetery (Persian: گورستان خالد نبی, "Cemetery of the Prophet Khaled") is a cemetery in northeastern Iran's Golestan province near the border with Turkmenistan, roughly 60 kilometres (40 mi) northeast of Gonbad-e Kavous city, in the Gokcheh Dagh hills of Turkmen Sahra. It is mainly situated on a mountain ridge about 1 km distance from the mausoleum called “Khaled Nabi” who according to oral tradition of the Yomut Turkomans was a pre-Islamic prophet and whose mausoleum is visited by them for pilgrimage together with the neighbouring one of Ata Chofun ("Father Shepherd"), his son-in-law.

== Description of the cemetery site ==
The cemetery was visited in 1979 and 1980 by the archeologist David Stronach. He found over 600 standing stones which are spread out in several locations. About half of them are on the ridge which he calls "High Plateau". South and south-east of that are small groups of stones on several other ridges and hillocks. At some distance there is another group of perhaps 150 stones which are distributed over a wide area on the south side of the mountain.

== The cemetery in popular perception ==
In popular media the stones are often described as examples of phallic architecture and a major tourist attraction.

Touristic visitors often have perceived the cylindrical shafts with the thicker top as depictions of male phalli. This gave rise to popular guesses about pre-Islamic fertility cults as background to such perceived depictions. Consequently, the rounded type 2 stones were attributed to female forms and graves. Such descriptions have added to the popularity of the site for visitors from distant parts of Iran. The tomb is a religious pilgrimage place where women pray seeking boons for their welfare, by way of tying ribbons in nearby trees. The isolated cemetery has become popular tourist attraction in Iran and a source of amusement amongst visitors.

The cemetery is now a national heritage site protected by the Iranian government.

== See also ==
- Khaled bin Sinan
