= Ech Chaïba =

Ech Chaïba الشعيبة Ouled Rahma
- Commune and town
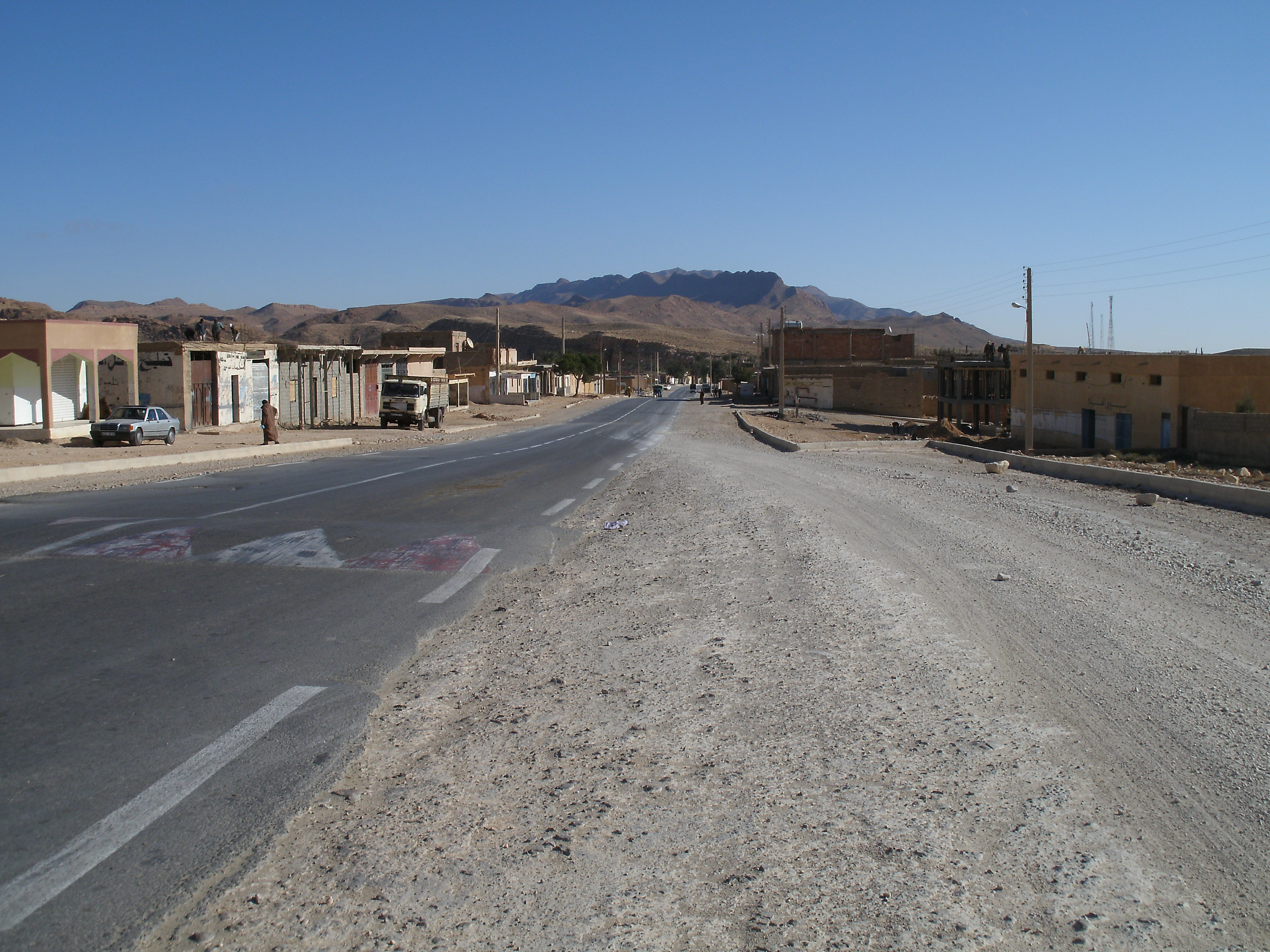
- Nickname: Ouled Rahma

- Location within Algeria
- Coordinates: 34°30′0″N 4°33′0″E
- Country: Algeria
- Province: Ouled Djellal Province
- Time zone: UTC+1 (CET)

Ouled Rahma is a town and commune in Ouled Djellal Province, Algeria, and was previously a commune of Biskra Province before the 2019 reorganization.
