= Tell Judaidah =

Archaeological site in Turkey

- Tell al-Judaidah, Tell Judeideh
- Location within Turkey
- 36°16′03″N 36°35′12″E
- Type: Tumulus (Tell)
- Periods: Pre-pottery, Chalcolithic, Bronze, Iron, Classical
- Location: Hatay province, Turkey
- Region: Amuk valley

Site notes
- Excavation dates: 1935-1937 1995-1996
- Archaeologists: Robert Braidwood, K. Aslihan Yener

Tell Judaidah (Tell al-Judaidah, Tell Judeideh) is an archaeological site in Mediterranean Turkey, in the Hatay province. It is one of the largest excavated ancient sites in the Amuq valley, in the plain of Antioch. Settlement at this site ranges from the Neolithic (6000 BC) through the Byzantine Period.

== Excavations ==
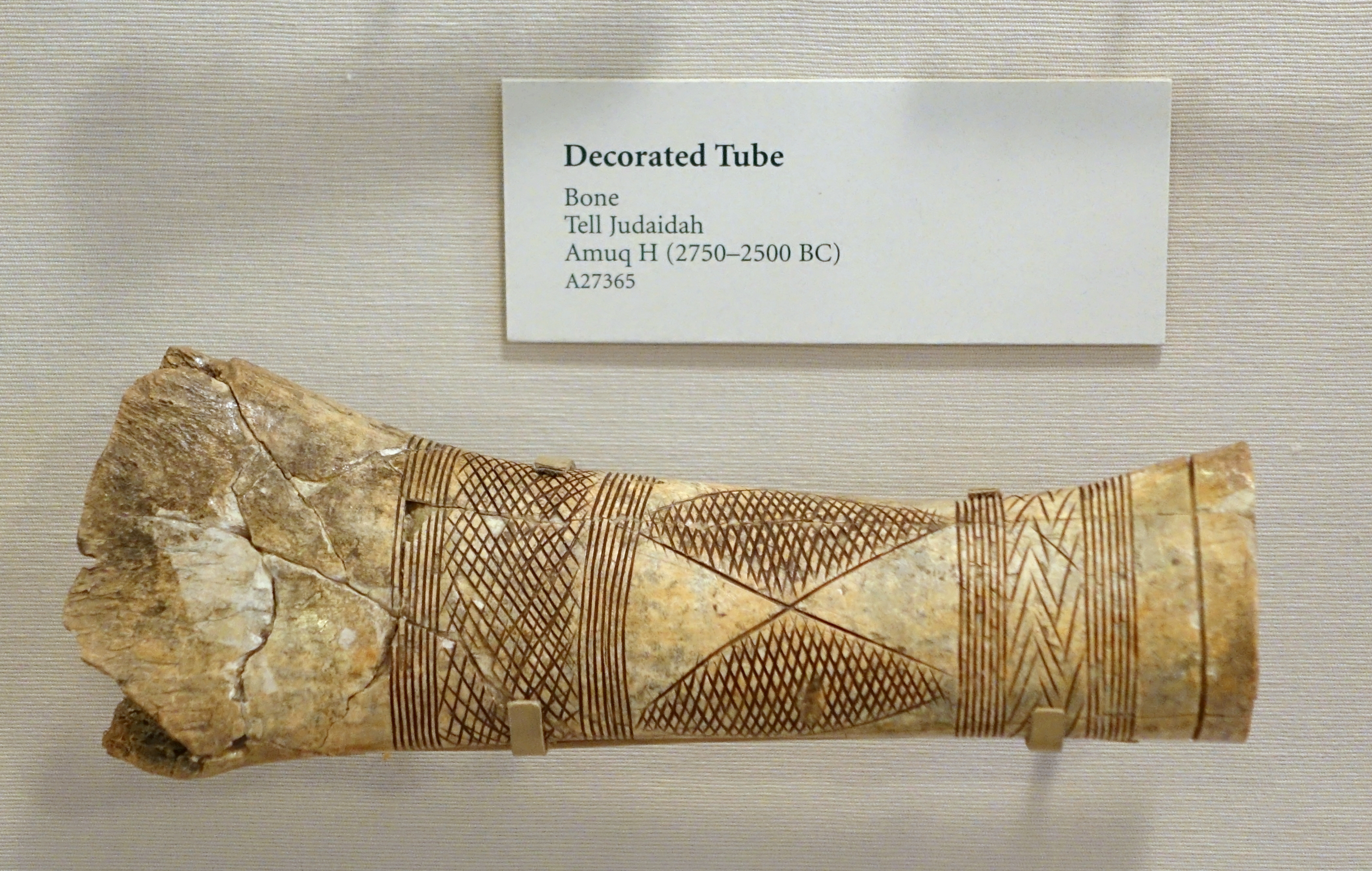
Decorated tube, Tell Judaidah, Amuq H, 2750-2500 BC, bone - Oriental Institute Museum, University of Chicago - DSC07687

The site rises about 30 meters above the plain. Maximum extent is 370 meters (East to West) and 250 meters (North to South). On the west of runs a stream, Nahr al-Judaidah or Kizil Irk. The remains of a c. 5th century Early Christian church were at the surface.

American archaeologist James Breasted of the Oriental Institute of the University of Chicago inspired the start of work at the site. Excavations by an Oriental Institute team led by Robert Braidwood beginning in September 1935, and revealed the existence of human settlements in the Amuk valley in the Neolithic period as early as 6,000 BC. Virgin soil was reached at about 30 meters below the summit of the mound. Rich discoveries of pottery helped to establish the sequence of successive ceramic shapes in the areas of the Eastern Mediterranean. Also found was a cylinder seal, dated between the 13th and 14th centuries BC, showing "two goats leap toward the branches held by a cross-legged god, who is accompanied by genii bearing flowing vases".

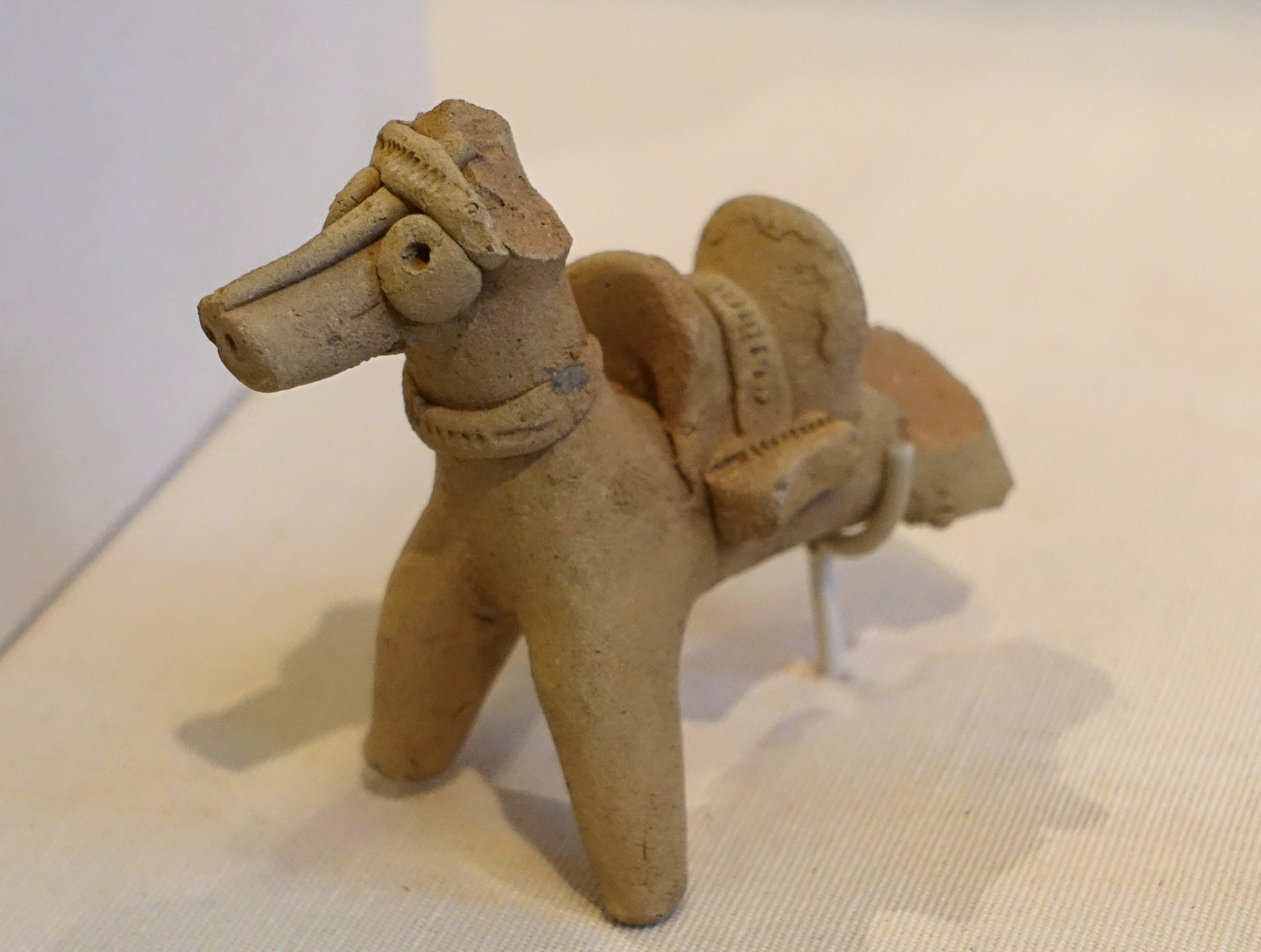
Horse with saddle, Amuq Valley, Tell Judaidah, Amuq J, Early Bronze Age IV, 2300-2000 BC, found in Amuq P level, ceramic - Oriental Institute Museum, University of Chicago - DSC07642

Archaeological discoveries at Tell Judaidah included crucibles with tin rich copper encrustations, indicating a very early use of advanced metallurgical techniques around 4500 BC, including the use of metal alloys. Among a hoard of bronze objects was a bronze lugged axe found in Level II and context dated to between Early Dynastic II period and middle Akkadian period. A cache of six very early copper statuettes were discovered here dating to the period of 3400-2750 BC. Half were male and half were female. These are known as 'Amuq G figurines'. They were cast using a lost wax process. 'Wheel-made Plain Simple Ware' was also discovered dating to the same Amuq G period.

The site was visited in 1995 by a team from the Oriental Institute led by K. Aslihan Yener in response to bulldozer damage to the mound. Some soundings were also conducted. Examination revealed the remains of a 1.5 meter thick building wall of mud bricks on stone foundations, radiocarbon dated to c. 3000 BC.

== History ==
Tell Judaidah was occupied from the Halaf period, through the Uruk period, Helladic period, Syro-Hittite period, Hellenic period, Roman period, and up until Byzantine times.

== Tell Dhahab ==
Tell Dhahab is located in near proximity to Tell Judaidah and is associated with it. It was excavated in 1938 in conjunction with the original Chicago expedition to Tell Judaidah. In recent decades, the site sustained serious damage. Scott Branting visited and evaluated the site in 1995 and 1998 seasons. Distinct stratigraphic phases were observed starting with Amuq Phase A. The following pottery styles were found: Dark faced burnished ware, Washed Impressed Ware, Plain Simple Ware, Reserved Slip Ware. Red Black Burnished Ware appeared in Amuq Phase H.

== See also ==
- Tell Tayinat
- Euphrates Syrian Pillar Figurines
- Euphrates Handmade Syrian Horses and Riders
