= Ouled Harkat =

Coordinates: 34°09′00″N 4°59′27″E

- Commune and town
- Country: Algeria
- Province: Ouled Djellal Province
- Time zone: UTC+1 (CET)

Ouled Harkat, also known as Besbes, is a town and commune in Ouled Djellal Province, Algeria. It was previously a commune of Biskra Province before the 2019 reorganization.
