= Pattin =

Ancient Luwian Neo-Hittite state

Pattin/Unqi
- Before 870 BC–738 BC
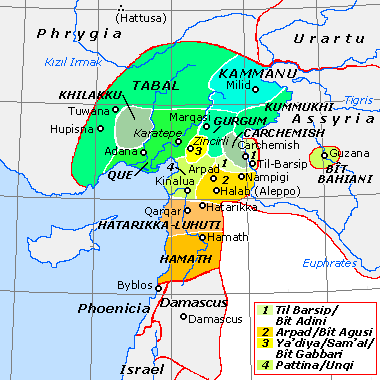
- Pattin(a)/Unqi and its capital Kinalua among the Neo-Hittite states
- Capital: Kinalua
- Common languages: Luwian; Aramaic
- Religion: Luwian religion
- Government: Monarchy
- Historical era: Iron Age
  - Established: Before 870 BC
  - Disestablished: 738 BC
Preceded by	Succeeded by
Palistin	Neo-Assyrian Empire
- Today part of: Turkey; Syria

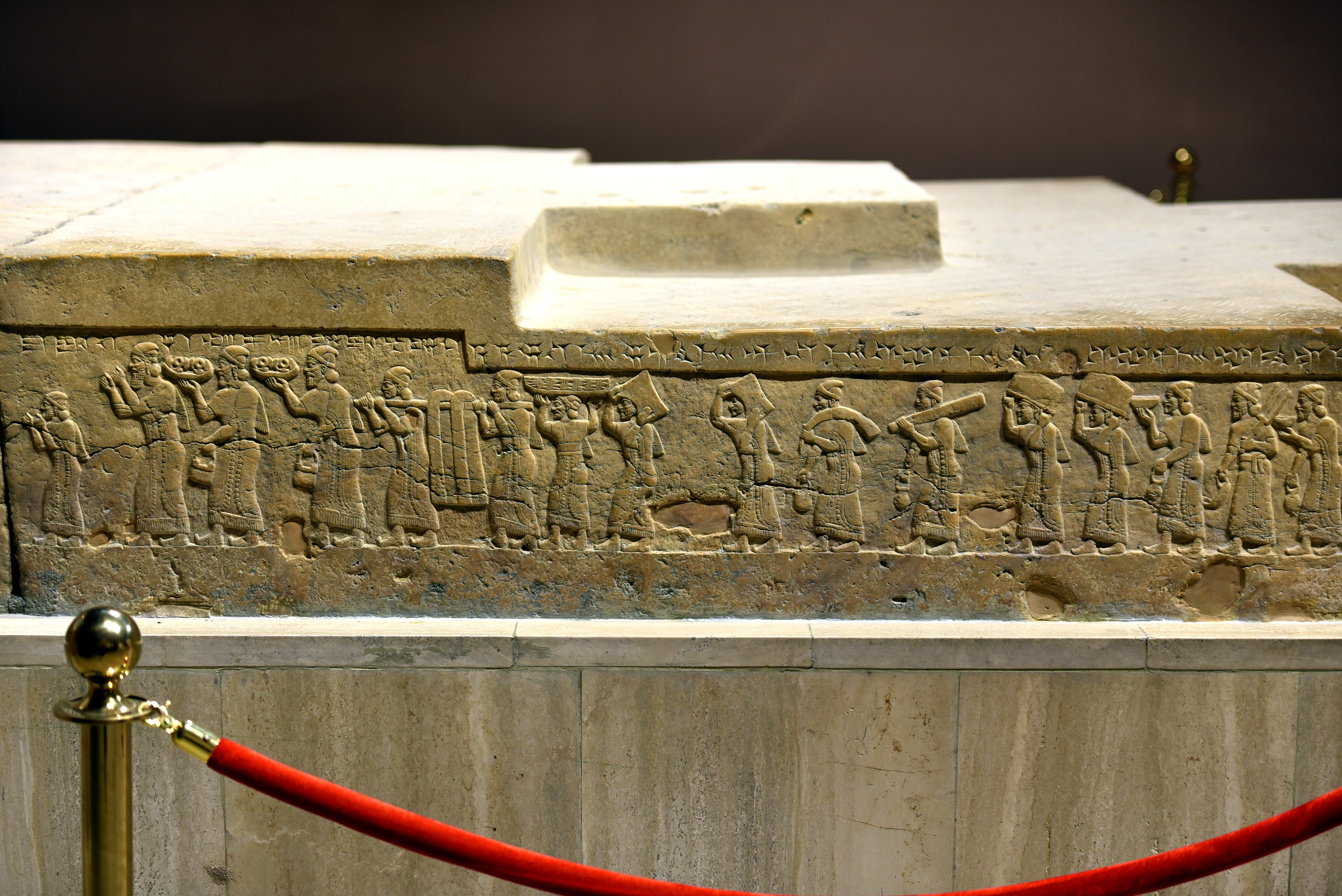
Tributary procession led by Qalparunda of the Land of Unqi, detail of the throne dais of Shalmaneser III, Iraq Museum

Pattin (also known as Pattina, Patina, Unqu and Unqi), was an ancient Luwian Neo-Hittite state at the beginning of the 1st millennium BC. It was known to the Assyrians as Unqi and Aramaeans as Unqu.

It was located at the north-western coast of ancient Syria, associated with the modern-day Hatay. The capital of the state was Kinalua (Kunalua, Kalneh, or Kinaluwa), which has been tentatively associated with Tell Tayinat in modern-day Turkey.

== History ==
=== Iron Age ===
The state was formed in the 9th century BC towards the end of the Dark Age period, and shared a north-western border with the Neo-Hittite state of Quwê. Khazazu (modern-day Azaz) was one of Pattin's dependencies which was invaded by Assyria around 870 BC. The frontier fortress of Aribua (associated with the modern-day region of Idlib) within the land of Lukhuti to the immediate south of Pattin was also ravaged.

== List of kings ==
- Taita I (11th century)
- Taita II (early 10th century)
- Manana (10th century)
- Suppiluliuma I (late 10th century)
- Halparuntiya I (10th or early 9th century)
- Lubarna I (c. 870/875 – 858?)
- Suppiluliuma II (Assyrian Sapalulme, fl. 858–857)
- Halparuntiya II (Assyrian Qalparunda, fl. 857–853)
- Lubarna II (829, died 831)
- Surri (831)
- Sasi (from 831)
- ...
- Tutammu (died 738)

The name Suppiluliuma corresponds to the Assyrian Sapalalme and Halparuntiya to Qalparunda.
