= Amik Valley =

Plain in southern Turkey

- Amik Ovası (Turkish) ٱلْأَعْمَاق (Arabic)
- Amuq Valley
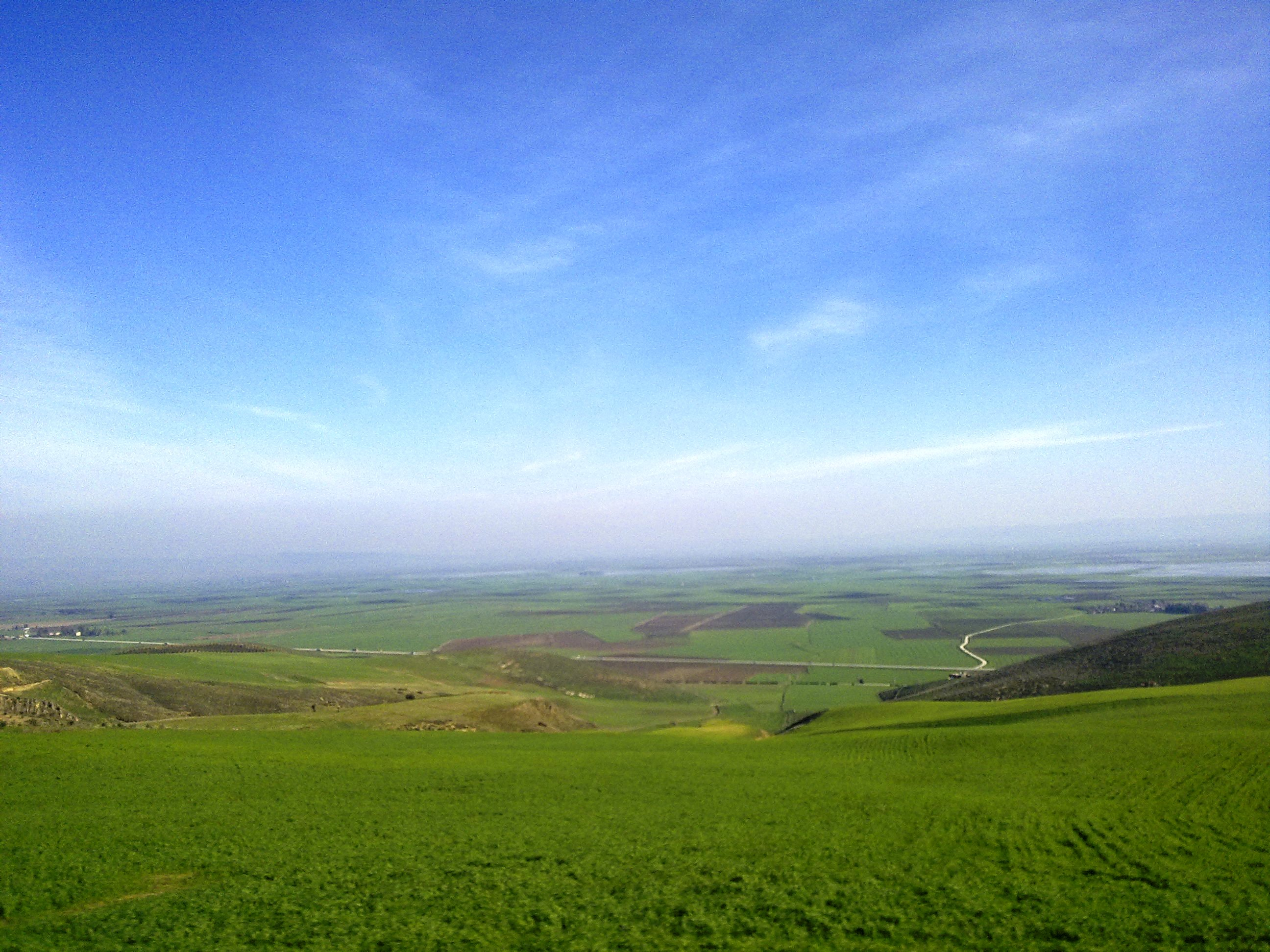

- Location within Turkey Location within Middle East Location within Asia
- 36.33°N 36.33°E
- Type: Cluster of Tells
- Periods: PPNB, Neolithic
- Location: Hatay, Turkey
- Region: Ash-Shaam

Site notes
- Condition: Ruins
- Public access: Yes

The Amik Valley (Turkish: Amik Ovası; Arabic: ٱلْأَعْمَاق, romanized: al-ʾAʿmāq) is a plain in Hatay Province, southern Turkey. It is close to the city of Antakya (Antioch on the Orontes River). Along with Dabiq in northwestern Syria, it is believed to be one of two possible sites of the battle of Armageddon according to Islamic eschatology.

== Archaeological significance ==
It is notable for a series of archaeological sites in the "plain of Antioch". The primary sites of the series are Tell al-Judaidah, Chatal Höyük (Amuq) (not to be confused with Çatalhöyük in Anatolia), Tell Tayinat, Tell Kurdu, Alalakh, and Tell Dhahab. Al-Mina, at the mouth of the Orontes river, was the main ancient port of the area.

Lake Amik was an ancient lake in the area, that was located in the centre of Amik Plain.

Tell Judaidah was surveyed by Robert Braidwood and excavated by C. MacEwan of the Oriental Institute of the University of Chicago in the 1930s.

There is also archaeological evidence for Caspian tigers in this valley (Ellerman and Morrison-Scott, 1951; Vallino and Guazzo Albergoni, 1978).

== Islamic eschatology ==
In a hadith, Abu Hurayrah (a companion of the Islamic Nabi (Prophet) Muhammad) reported that Muhammad said:

The Last Hour would not come until the Romans land at al-A'maq or in Dabiq. An army consisting of the best of the people of Earth at that time will come from Medina (to counteract them).

— Sahih Muslim, Volume 41, Chapter 9, Hadith 6924

Islamic scholars and hadith commentators suggest that the word "Romans" refers to Christians. The hadith further relates the subsequent Muslim victory, followed by the peaceful takeover of Constantinople with invocations of takbir and tasbih, and finally the defeat of the Anti-Christ following the return and descent of Jesus Christ. Other hadiths relate the appearance of Imam Mahdi immediately before the Second Coming of Jesus.
