= Šuppiluliuma (Kummuh) =

Šuppiluliuma (Akkadian: Ušpilulume; Hieroglyphic Luwian: PURU.S.FONS.MI-sa) was a Neo-Hittite king of Kummuh (Classical Commagene), attested in various sources between 805 and 773 BC. He bore the title of ruler.

== Dynastic placement ==
It is not known who ruled between Šuppiluliuma's last attested predecessor, Kundašpu (around 856 BC), and Šuppiluliuma himself, but the fact that he ruled for 32 years from 805 BC makes the existence of at least one otherwise-unknown king between them likely. He may have been a later descendant of the Hittite Great Kings, as he bore the name of two Hittite Great Kings.

== Reign ==
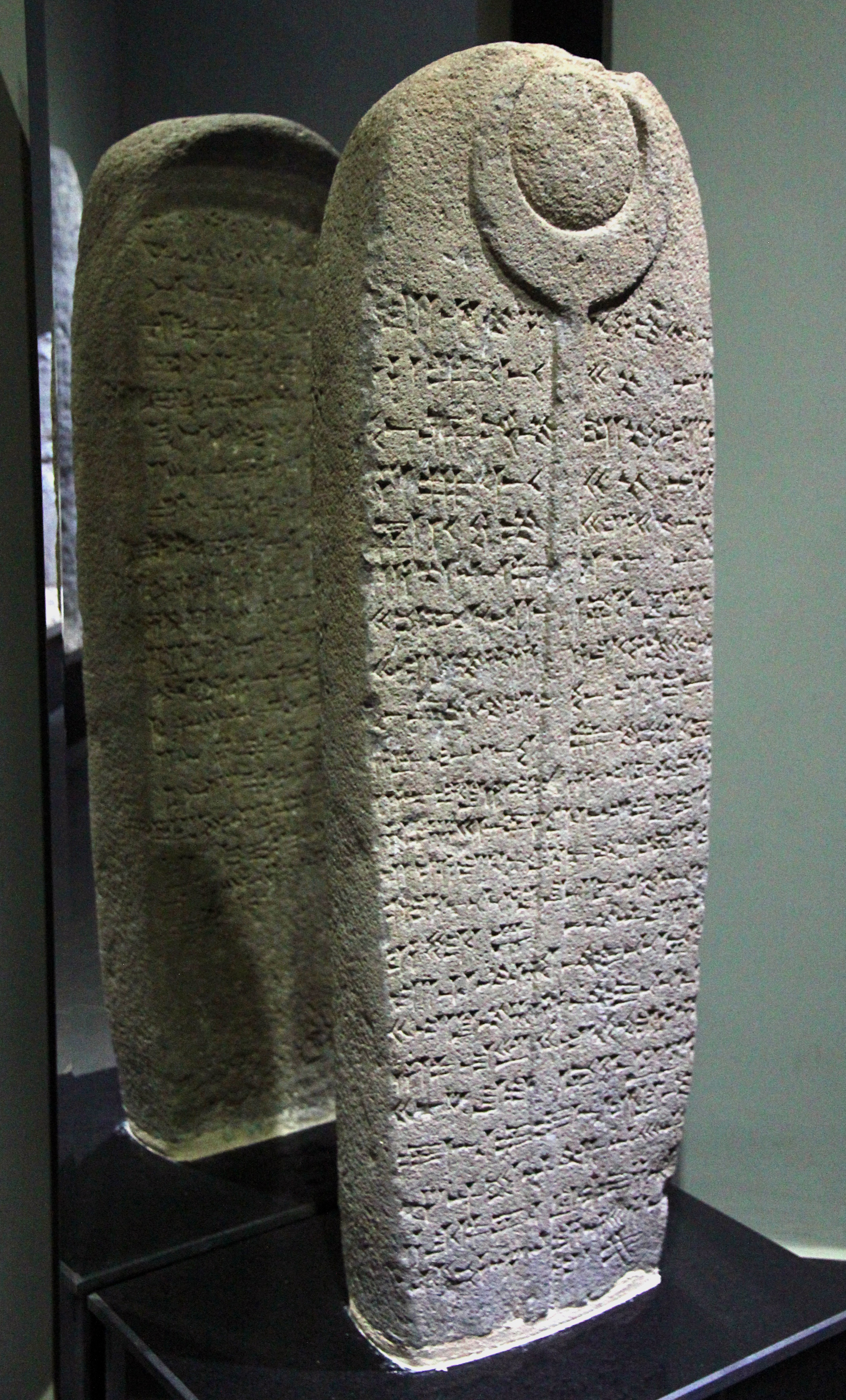
The Pazarcık stele in the Kahramanmaraş Archaeology Museum

Šuppiluliuma appears in Assyrian sources on the Pazarcık stele. This boundary stone, erected in 805 BC on the orders of the Assyrian king Adad-nirari III at the border between the Neo-Hittite states of Kummuh and Gurgum, names him as king of Kummuh, an Assyrian vassal state. The boundary marker was set up because Kummuh received a territory that had previously belonged to Gurgum. Šuppiluliuma had earlier called upon the Assyrian king for aid after being threatened over territorial matters by Halparuntiya III of Gurgum.Trevor Bryce, The World of the Neo-Hittite Kingdoms: A Political and Military History, Oxford / New York 2012, p. 245. He was also threatened by an alliance headed by Attar-šumki I of Arpad.

During a campaign against Kummuh and other states, the stele was seized by Bar-Hadad II of Damascus. The Assyrian commander Šamši-ilu recovered the monument in 773 BC and re-erected it in its original place, noting that Šuppiluliuma was still on the throne of Kummuh. The boundaries were once again confirmed by the reigning Assyrian king Shalmaneser IV.

Šuppiluliuma is also mentioned in local Hieroglyphic Luwian inscriptions, including the Inscriptions of Boybeypınarı, in which his wife Panamuwati and her father Azamis dedicate a throne, a statue, and a table to the goddess Kubaba. Three other inscriptions name him together with his son Hattusili, the designated heir — among them Ancoz 5 and Ancoz 7. He is also probably the ruler mentioned on the Adıyaman 1 stele. Šuppiluliuma's son ruled Kummuh in the mid-8th century BC as Hattusili II, bearing the same title of ruler.

Preceded by Kundašpu	King of Kummuh; 805–773 BC	Succeeded by Hattusili II
