= Tell Tayinat =

Archaeological site on the Orontes River in Hatay Province, Turkey

Tell Ta'yinat
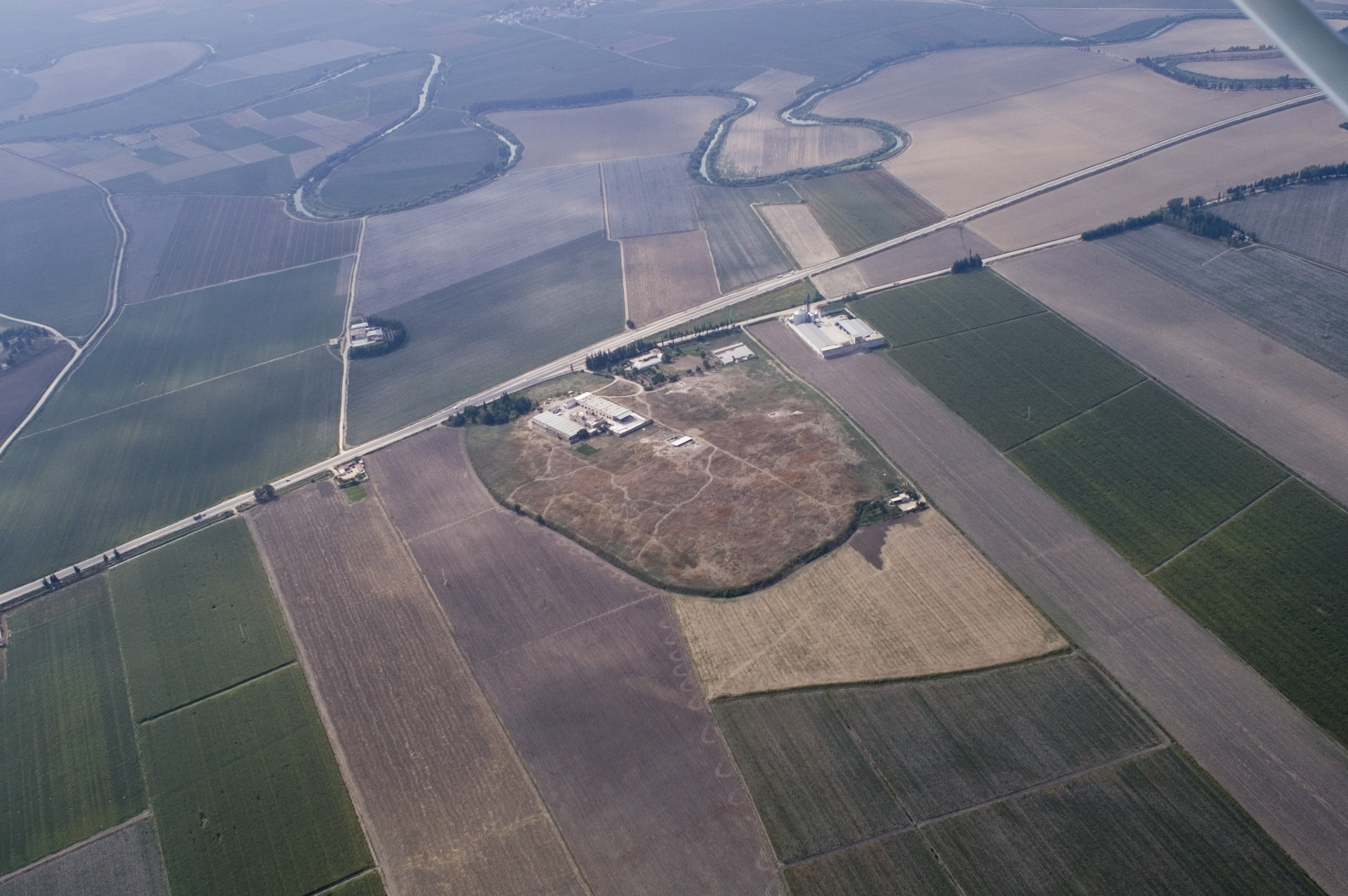
- Tell Tayinat

- Location within Turkey
- 36°14′51″N 36°22′35″E
- Type: Settlement
- Periods: Early Bronze Age, Early Iron Age
- Cultures: Neo-Hittite, Aramean
- Location: Hatay Province, Turkey
- Region: Levant

Site notes
- Excavation dates: 1935-1938, 2003-present
- Archaeologists: Robert Braidwood, Timothy Harrison
- Condition: In ruins

Tell Ta'yinat is a low-lying ancient tell on the east bank at the bend of the Orontes River where it flows through the Amuq Valley, in the Hatay province of Mediterranean Turkey about 25 kilometers south east of Antakya (ancient Antioch), and lies near Tell Atchana, the site of the ancient city of Alalakh. Tell Ta'yinat has been proposed as the site of Alalaḫu, inhabited in late 3rd millennium BC, mentioned in Ebla's Palace G archive; and in later times as Kinalua, the capital city of an Iron Age Neo-Hittite kingdom. Among the findings are an Iron Age temple and several 1st millennium BC cuneiform tablets. Chatal Huyuk (Amuq) is another major site that is located in the area.

== Identification ==
Archaeologist Timothy Harrison, the dig director for many years starting in 2004, supports the identification of the site with Kinalua, the capital of a Neo-Hittite/Aramean Iron Age kingdom. In the period of Neo-Assyrian control it was the center of the Unqi province.

It is a possible site of the city of Calneh mentioned in the Hebrew Bible.

== History ==
Archaeological excavation at the tell has indicated, in conjunction with ancient written sources, that the site was a major urban centre in two separate phases, during the Early Bronze Age and Early Iron Age.

The site consists of an upper mound of about 20 hectares and a lower mound (now under floodplain cover, extending to the north (around 200 meters), east (around 100 meters), and southeast (slight extent). About 550 square meters of the upper mound (north and east sides) have been removed by modern bulldozer activities. In the Early Bronze Age the site was somewhat larger than the current upper mound at around 25 hectares, based on coring and surface collection, with the remains measuring in at 3 to 6 meters in depth.

=== Early Bronze Age ===
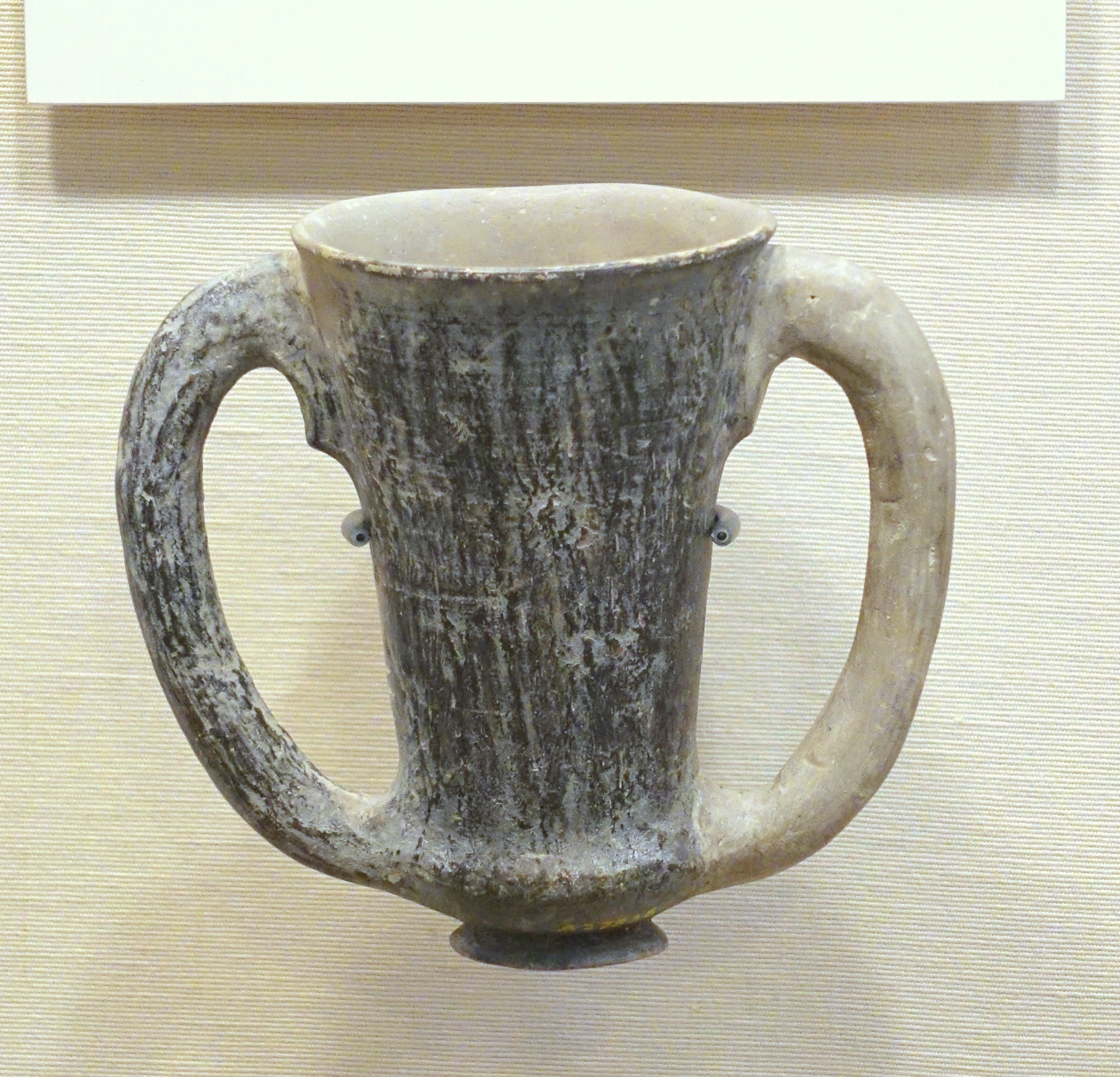
Depas amphikypellon (two-handled drinking cup), Tell Tayinat, Amuq J, 2200-2000 BC, ceramic. Oriental Institute Museum, University of Chicago

Red-black burnished ware (Khirbet Kerak ware) was found in Phases H and I, corresponding to the Early Dynastic period in Mesopotamia. This type of pottery diminishes through the end of the last phase of EBA. This pottery is believed to be influenced by the Kura-Araxes culture, arriving into this area around 3000 BC.

In the Amuq Plain, Tell Tayinat was the largest settlement in the EBIVB. The structural remains from Tell Tayinat have been from the Early Bronze IVB period (Phase J). Among the finds are 17 anthropomorphic and zoomorphic figurines in a style typical of the region at that time. Also found were two wheels, copper alloy metal fragments, spindle whorls and loom weights. Notable finds were a cylinder seal and two clay sealings.

=== Iron Age ===
The Iron Age I followed the Fall of the Hittite Empire and saw the rise of small independent Neo-Hittite/Aramean city-states in the Northern Levant.

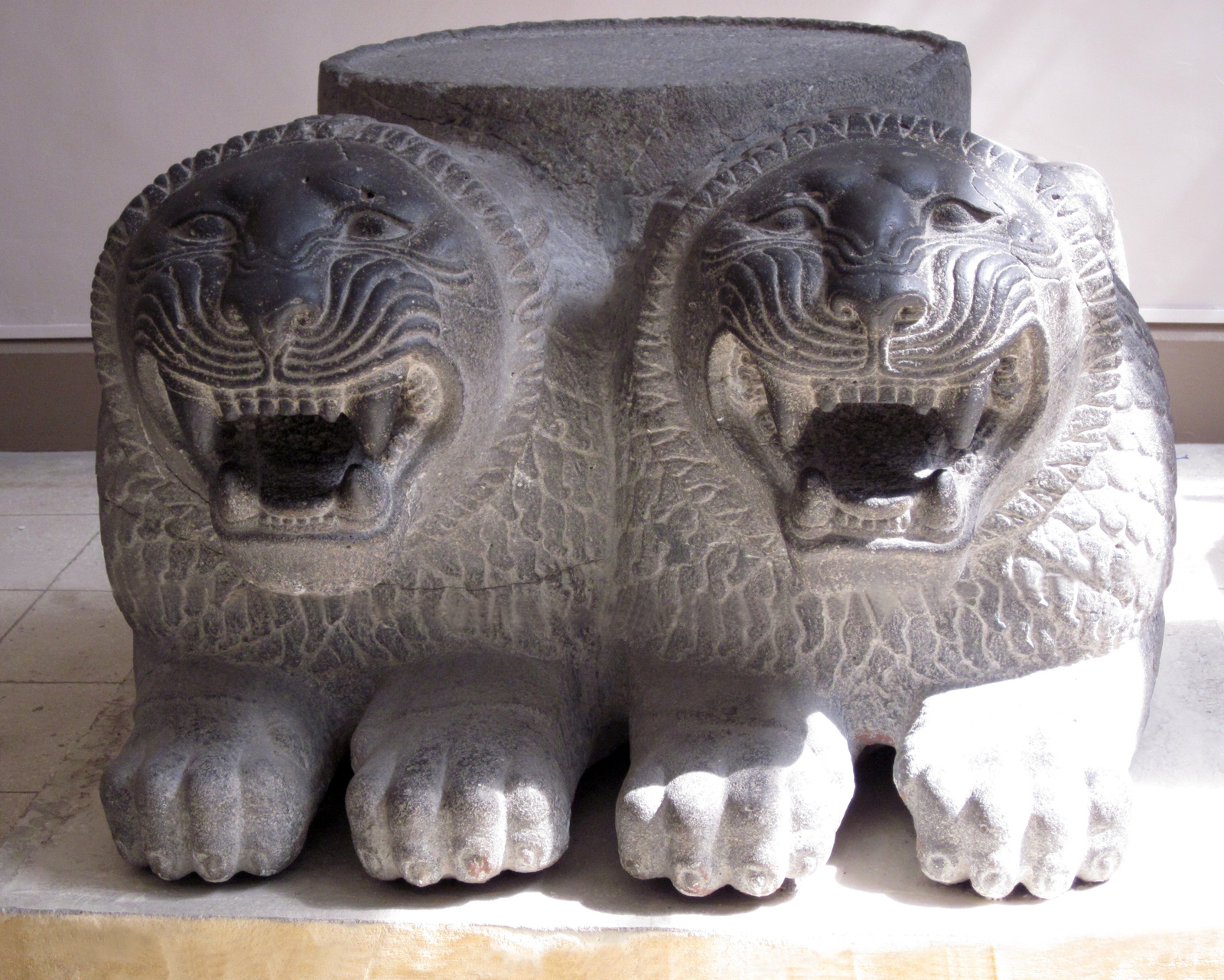
Twin lion column base, portico of Temple II (1930s finding), maybe from gate-like structure for Temples XVI or II (mid-9th century BCE) Antakya Archaeological Museum.

During the Iron Age II, this is thought likely to be the site of ancient Kinalua, the capital of one of the Neo-Hittite/Aramean city-kingdoms of Walistin (Aramaic) or Palistin (neo-Hittite), of which a follow-up kingdom is the one known as Pattin or Patina, the shortened form of Palistin (together c. 1000–738 BC). Among the culturally diverse Neo-Hittite states in the north Syrian river-plain the rulers of Kinalua continued to bear royal Hittite names in the 8th century BC. With the rise of the Neo-Assyrians in the 9th century BC, rulers of Patina (thought to be the same as Kinalua) began to pay tribute to them. Ashurnasirpal II reports receiving silver and gold, 100 talents of tin, essential for making bronze, and 100 talents of iron, 1000 oxen and 10,000 sheep, linen robes and decorated couches and beds of boxwood, as well as "10 female singers, the king's brother's daughter with a rich dowry, a large female monkey and ducks" from the ruler Labarna. At a later campaign the Assyrians forced its king Tutammu to submit according to an inscription of king Tiglath-pileser III (745–727 BC). Other documents indicate Assyrian control lasted until the reign of Ashurbanipal (669–631 BC).

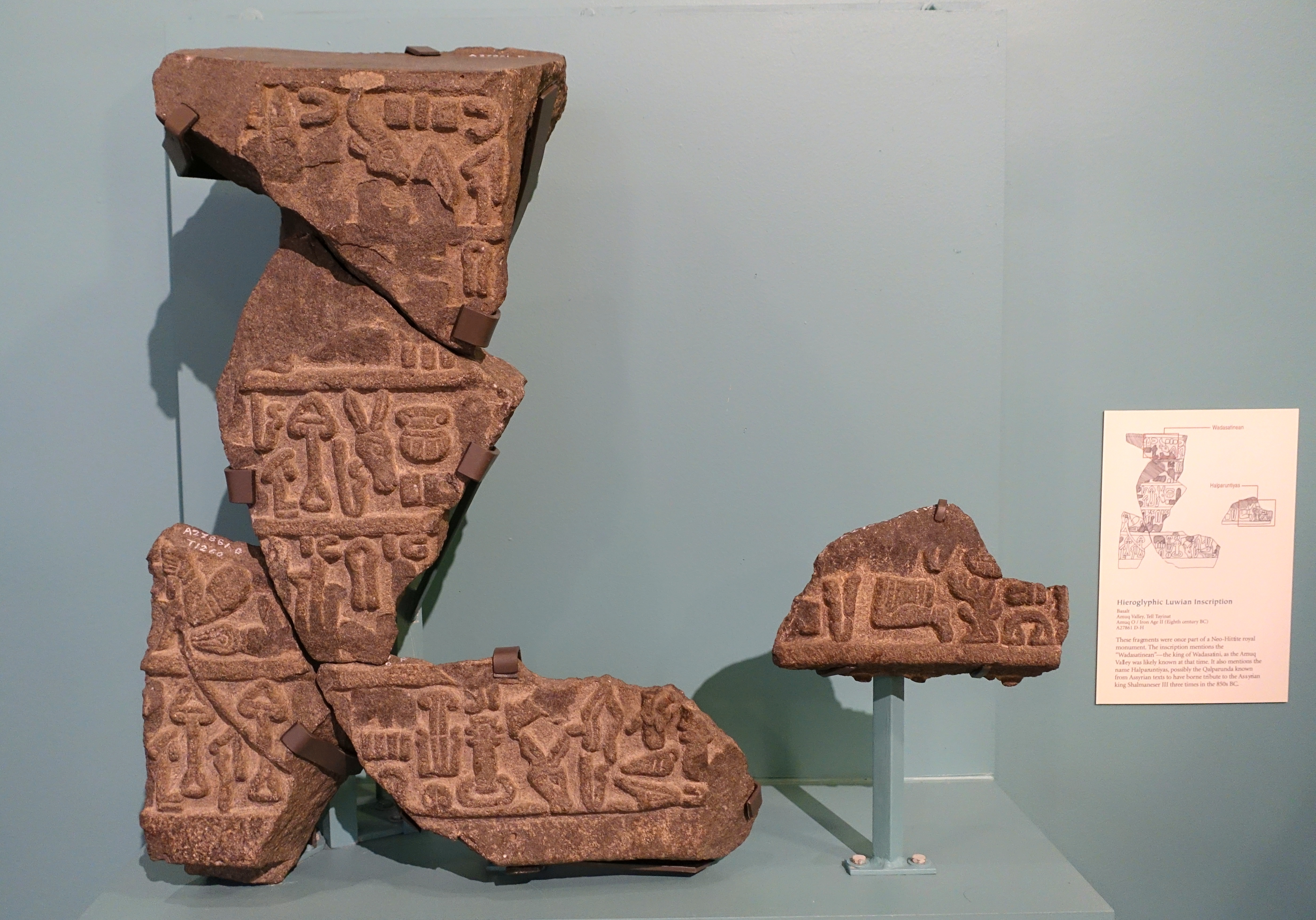
Fragmentary basalt inscription in hieroglyphic Luwian script from royal monument, 8th century BC (Iron Age II, Amuq O). Oriental Institute Museum, Chicago

The city had a citadel placed at a higher elevation, connected to the lower city by a monumental gate complex (see Site layout).

==== Iron Age temple ====
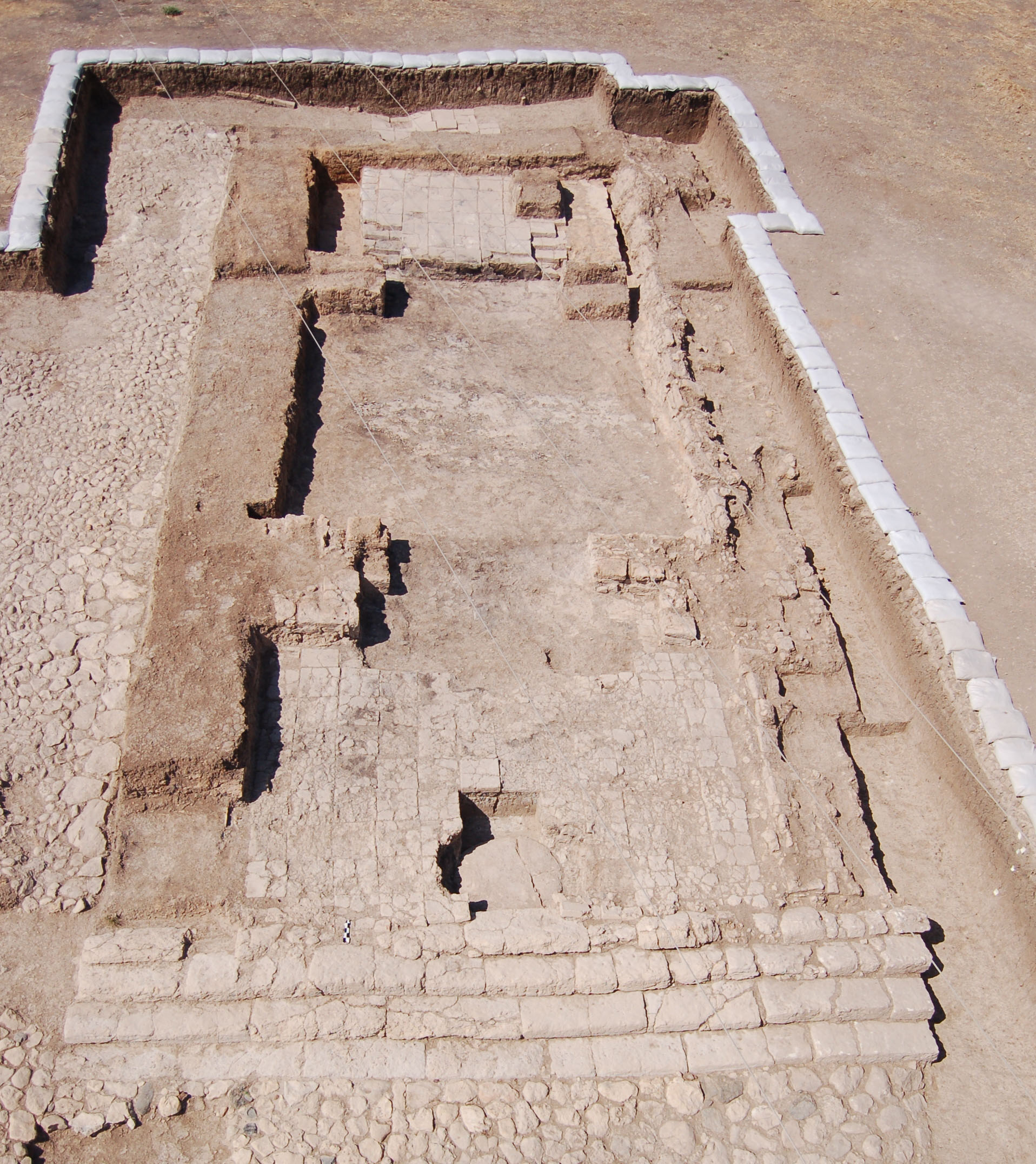
Iron Age Temple

One of the key finds of the Oriental Institute (1935–38) made at the site was a temple reminiscent in plan to Solomon's Temple in Jerusalem as described in the Hebrew Bible (Old Testament of Christianity).

==== Bit-hilani palaces ====
The Oriental Institute campaigns (1935–38) brought to light several large palaces in the style known as bit-hilani. A wood sample from a bit-hilani burned in c. 675 BC was carbon-dated to 2625 +/- 50 years BP. The 2005 excavations exposed part of one of the early Iron Age II bit-hilanis.

==== King Suppiluliuma statue ====
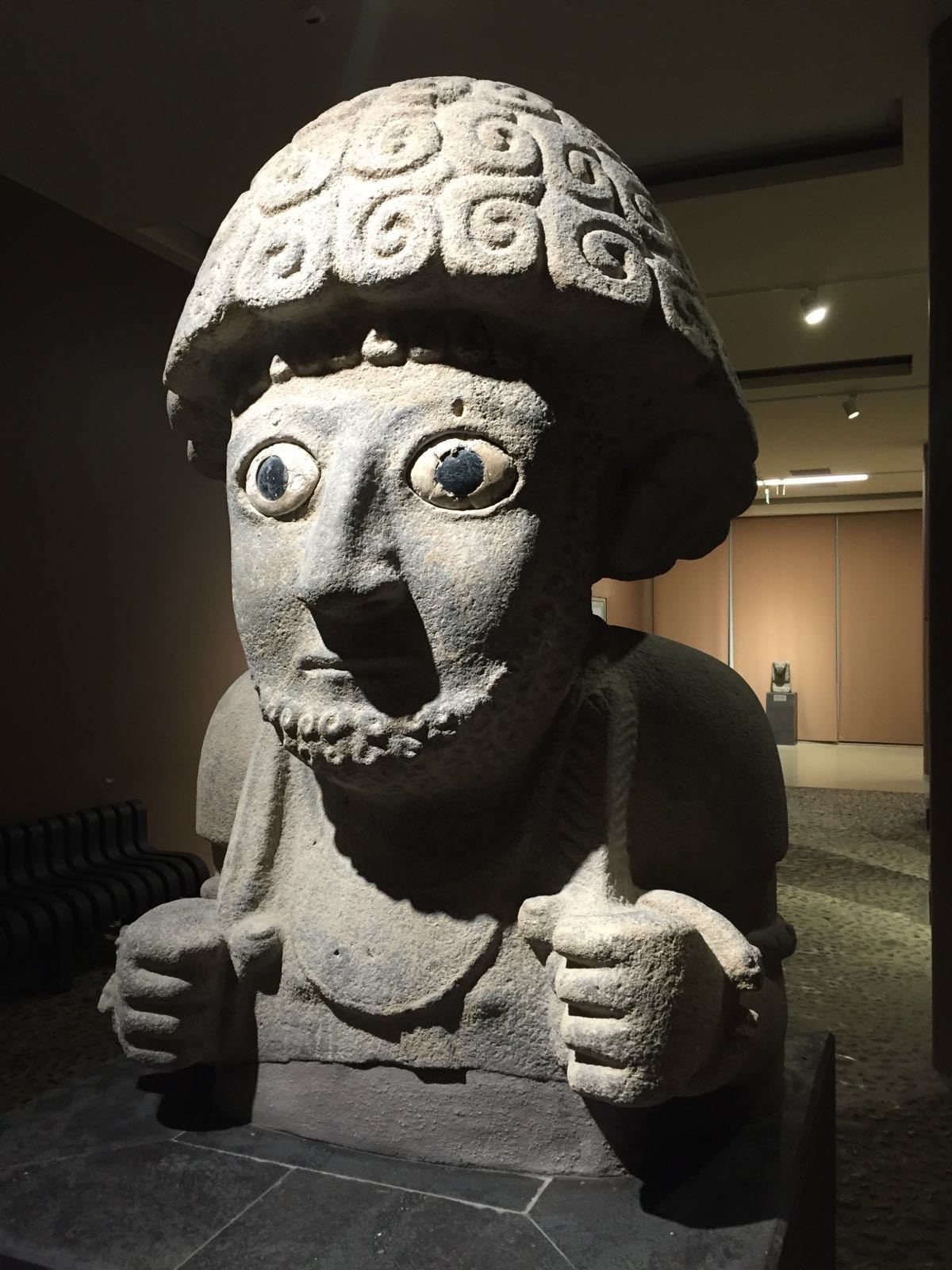
King Suppiluliuma in Hatay Archaeology Museum

In August 2012, a team from the University of Toronto announced they had uncovered the head and torso of a human figure, intact to just above its waist. The remains of the figure stand approximately 1.5 meters in height, suggesting a total height of 3.5 to 4 meters. The figure is bearded with eyes made of black and white stone. The figure's hair has been styled in an elaborate series of curls arranged in rows. The arms of the figure extend forward from the elbow. Each arm has two arm bracelets adorned with lion heads. The figure's left hand holds a shaft of wheat and its right hand holds a spear. The figure's chest is adorned with a crescent-shaped pectoral. A lengthy carved, raised relief inscription in Hieroglyphic Luwian runs across the figure's back. The inscription records the accomplishments and campaigns of King Suppiluliuma. He is likely the same king who as part of a Syrian-Hittite coalition in 858 BC fought against the Neo-Assyrian invasion of Shalmaneser III.

==== Female statue ====
In August 2017, it was reported that a majestic female statue was discovered at the site, within the monumental gate complex leading to the upper citadel. This may be an image of Kubaba, divine mother of the gods of ancient Anatolia. Or it may be Kupapiyas, who was the wife – or possibly mother – of Taita, the dynastic founder of ancient Tayinat. But it's also possible that the statue represents the wife of King Suppiluliuma. Archaeologist Timothy Harrison raised the possibility that women played quite a prominent role in the political and religious lives of these early Iron Age communities.

==== Sargon Stele ====
A worn stone with cuneiform writing from the top of the mound was turned into the local museum by a farmer who had used it as a paving stone. Combined with 4 fragments found during the 1930 excavation it turned out to be part of a stele of Sargon II (722–705 BC).

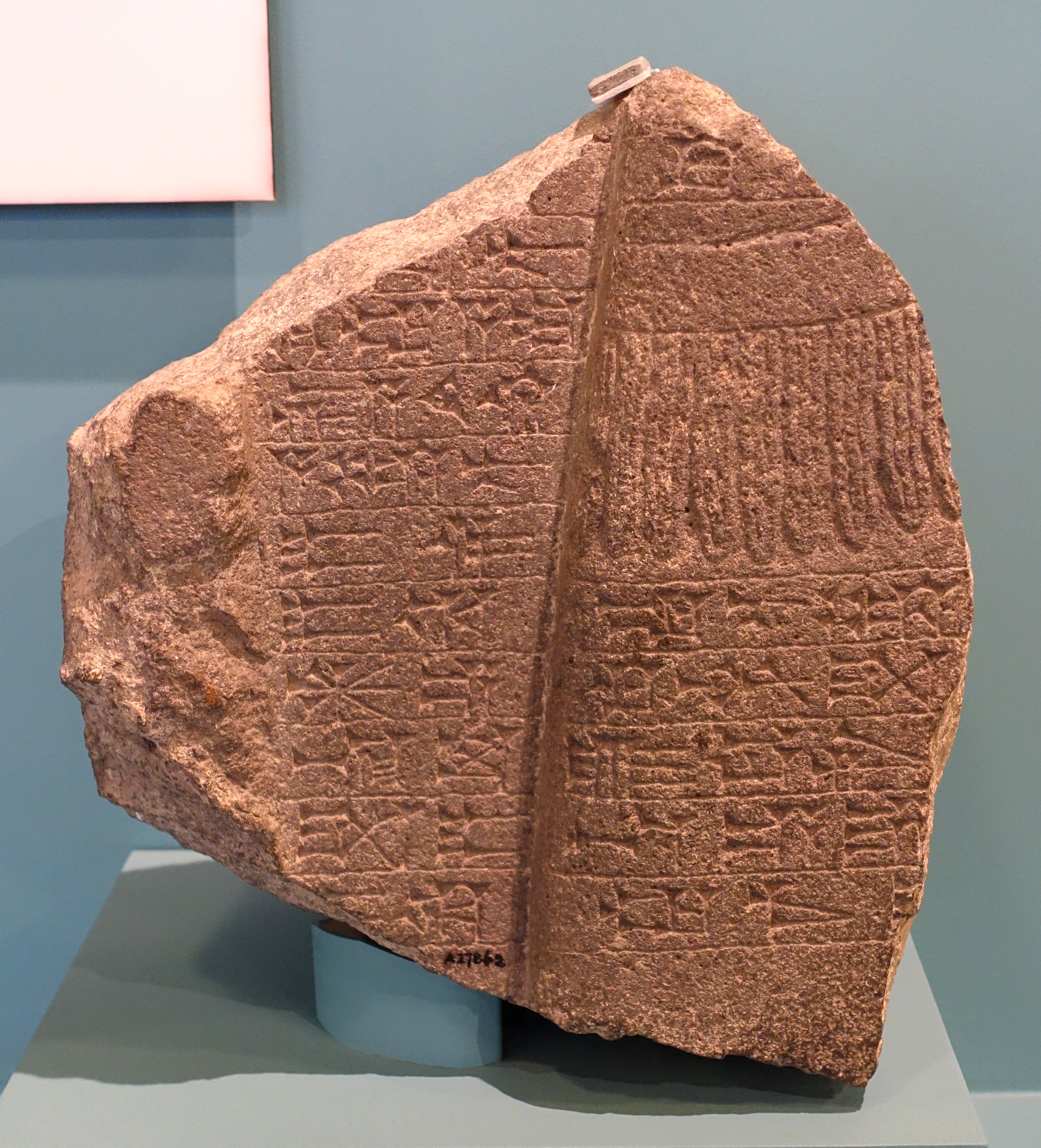
Sargon Stele, cuneiform-inscribed basalt fragment with king's lower back and belt, 750-650 BC (Iron Age III, Amuq O). Oriental Institute Museum, Chicago

== Archaeology ==
Four seasons of archaeological excavations were conducted at the site by the University of Chicago's Oriental Institute from 1935 to 1938, led by Robert Braidwood. From 1999 to 2002, the Oriental Institute returned to the site, as part of the Tayinat Archaeological Project, to conduct mapping and surveying and to examine the original excavations.

New excavations at the site were begun by a team from the University of Toronto in 2004, after a survey in 2003. Continued excavations in the summer of 2005 exposed more of the Iron Age temple as well as part of one of the early Iron Age II bit-hilanis. A significant amount of earlier Iron Age I material was also uncovered as well as small amounts of Early Bronze Age material. Excavations have continued now for a total of 13 seasons, through 2016. Findings have included a significant Iron Age temple, a number of 1st millennium BC cuneiform tablets, and initial structures from the earlier Bronze Age settlement. The majority of the tablets were found in the inner sanctum of a temple (Building XVI) in the sacred precinct. Most of the tablets are Iqqur Ipuš (a menologium), but they include a copy of the succession treaty of Esarhaddon. A lecture by James Osborne, on "The Syro-Anatolian City States: A Neglected Iron Age Culture" addresses aspects of the site.

In 2023, a large earthquake heavily damaged the expedition house and the storage area for Tayanat finds. All finds were safely transferred. In 2024, the Oriental Institute resumed work at the site.

== See also ==
- Tell Judaidah, another archaeological mound in the Amuq valley
- Cities of the ancient Near East
- Short chronology timeline
- Euphrates Syrian Pillar Figurines
- Euphrates Handmade Syrian Horses and Riders

== Future reading ==
- Langis-Barsetti, D. "Building Kunulua Block by Block: Exploring Archaeology through Minecraft", Near Eastern Archaeology 84(1), pp. 62–70, 2021
- Batiuk, S., and Harrison, T. P. "The Metals Trade and Early Bronze Age Craft Production at Tell Tayinat", pp. 48–66, in Overturning Certainties in Near Eastern Archaeology: A Festschrift in Honor of K. Aslihan Yener, ed. C. Maner, M. T. Horowitz, and A. S. Gilbert. Leiden, Boston: Brill, 2017
- Emanuel, J.P., "King Taita and his "Palistin": Philistine state or Neo-Hittite kingdom?", Antiguo Oriente, Cuadernos del Centro de Estudios de Historia del Antiguo Oriente, vol. 13. pp. 11–40, 2015
- Denel, E. and Harrison, T. P. The Neo-Hittite Citadel Gate at Tayinat (Ancient Kunulua). pp. 137–55 in The Archaeology of Anatolia: Recent Discoveries (2015–2016), Vol. 2. ed. S. Steadman and G. McMahon. Newcastle, UK: Cambridge Scholars Publishing, 2017
- Fales, Frederick Mario. "After Ta'yinat: the new status of Esarhaddon's adê for Assyrian political history", Revue d'assyriologie et d'archéologie orientale 106.1. pp. 133–158, 2012
- Manning, S.M., Lorentzen, B., Welton, L, Batiuk, S., Harrison, T.P. "Beyond megadrought and collapse in the Northern Levant: The chronology of Tell Tayinat and two historical inflection episodes, around 4.2ka BP, and following 3.2ka BP", PLOSOne, October 29, 2020. doi:10.1371/journal.pone.0240799
- Harrison, T., "The Iron Age I–II Transition in the Northern Levant: An Emerging Consensus?", Jerusalem Journal of Archaeology, pp. 325–351, 2021
- Harrison, Timothy P. "The Neo-Assyrian governor's residence at Tell Ta‘yinat", Journal (The Canadian Society for Mesopotamian Studies) 40, pp. 23–33, 2005
- Janeway, Brian. "The nature and extent of Aegean contact at Tell Ta'yinat and vicinity in the Early Iron Age: Evidence of the Sea Peoples". In "Cyprus, the Sea Peoples and the Eastern Mediterranean: Regional Perspectives of Continuity and Change". Scripta Mediterranea, Scripta Mediterranea, pp. 27–28, 2006
- Roames, Jim. "The Early Iron Age metal workshop at Tell Tayinat, Turkey", MRS Online Proceedings Library 1319.1, pp. 1–7, 2011
