= Al-Mina =

Ancient trading post on the Mediterranean coast of Syria

Coordinates: 36.0804°N 35.9871°E

Al-Mina (Arabic: 'the port') is the modern name given by Leonard Woolley to an ancient trading post on the Mediterranean coast of northern Syria, at the mouth of the Orontes River. It is now located in Hatay province in Turkey, in the urban area of Samandağ. Because of the changes in the coastline, it is now about 2 km away from the coast.

== Archaeology ==
The site, located in the large archaeological area of the Amuq plain, was excavated in 1936 by Leonard Woolley, who considered it to be an early Greek trading colony, founded a little before 800 BC, in direct competition with the Phoenicians to the south. He argued that substantial amounts of Greek pottery at the site established its early Euboean connections, while the Syrian and Phoenician cooking pottery reflected a cultural mix typical of an emporium. Disappointed in not finding a Bronze-Age port, Woolley soon moved his interests to the earlier, more urbane site of Alalakh.

Woolley's critics point out that he discarded coarse undecorated utilitarian wares, and that the relative numbers of Greek, Syrian and Phoenician populations have not been established. The controversy whether Al Mina is to be regarded as a native Syrian site, with Syrian architecture and cooking pots and a Greek presence, or as an Iron Age Greek trading post, has not been resolved.

Al-Mina has been largely overlooked in popular surveys. Later work considered Al-Mina as key to understanding the role of early Greeks in the east at the outset of the Orientalizing period of Greek cultural history.

Woolley identified Al-Mina with Herodotus' Posideion, but more recent scholarship places Posideion at Ras al-Bassit. Robin Lane Fox has made a case for the Greek name of the site to have been the Potamoi Karon that is mentioned in Diodorus Siculus' account of Ptolemy I Soter's ravaging of the coastline in 312 BC; he notes its unusual word order and suggestively links it to karu, "trading post", in the inscription text of Tiglath-Pileser III's conquests, which would give "River(s) of the Trading Posts". Woolley, on separate grounds, dated the final extinction of the Al-Mina settlement to the late fourth century BC, perhaps damaged during construction of the port of Seleucia Pieria just to the north. Lane Fox suggests instead this same voyage of coastal destruction was undertaken by Ptolemy in 312 BC.

According to The Princeton Encyclopedia of Classical Sites, the main period began in the late 9th century B.C., though there was a break around 700 B.C. During this time, evidence points to a trading post operated by Euboeans, Cypriots, and local inhabitants. By the 7th century B.C., Greek influence had become dominant. In the 6th century, under Babylonian rule, the site experienced a decline, but it was later reoccupied by Greeks and remained active until the late 4th century B.C., when its significance waned following the foundation of Seleucia Pieria.

Modern research has shown that Al Mina was a significant eastern trading settlement with strong Greek connections dating back to around 825 B.C. Excavations have revealed multiple layers of occupation, starting with simple huts and gradually developing into a major trading depot. Greek influence was evident from the earliest phases. Over time, the settlement shifted due to natural silting and erosion, with some earlier occupation possibly lost to the river. Around 700 B.C., Al Mina experienced a break in occupation, likely related to regional conflicts such as the Cilician revolt. It was subsequently rebuilt with an increased Greek presence. During the seventh and sixth centuries B.C., Aeginetan traders, who dealt primarily in Corinthian and Athenian goods, became prominent. Following a period of decline, Al Mina appears to have suffered a hiatus in the first half of the sixth century, possibly as a result of the Babylonian conquest and its negative effects on the region. Nevertheless, the settlement prospered under Persian rule from about 520 B.C., expanding and increasing imports from Greece despite ongoing wars between Greeks and Persians. Al Mina was eventually replaced by Seleucia in 301 B.C. The site functioned mainly as a commercial depot, featuring warehouses and shops but no residential housing, suggesting that merchants lived nearby rather than onsite. The exact ancient Greek name of Al Mina remains unknown. Although once thought to be the city of Posideum mentioned by Herodotus, this identification is disputed based on geographic evidence.

Close to Al Mina is the Cape Basit which has a history of Greek imports nearly as long as that of Al Mina, and its name almost certainly comes from Posideion.

Archaeological findings indicate that the Greeks established a settlement at Tell Sukas at approximately the same time they arrived at Al Mina.

== Significance ==
Al-Mina served as an outpost for cultural influences that accompanied trade with Urartu and the shortest caravan route to Assyrian cities of upper Mesopotamia. Through Al-Mina and Greek traders in Cyprus the Phoenician alphabet and other technology were transmitted to Euboea and mainland Greece in the eighth century BC. Al-Mina was destroyed about 700 BC, perhaps by Sennacherib, who repressed a rebellion at Tarsos in 696 BC, but it was immediately rebuilt. Pottery recovered from later levels of the site shows that a Greek presence remained at Al-Mina through to the fourth century BC, with pottery imported from Miletus and deftly imitated locally, apparently by Greek potters.

== See also ==
- Cities of the ancient Near East
- Short chronology timeline
