= Ouled Djellal =

Coordinates: 34°25′N 5°04′E

- province in Algeria
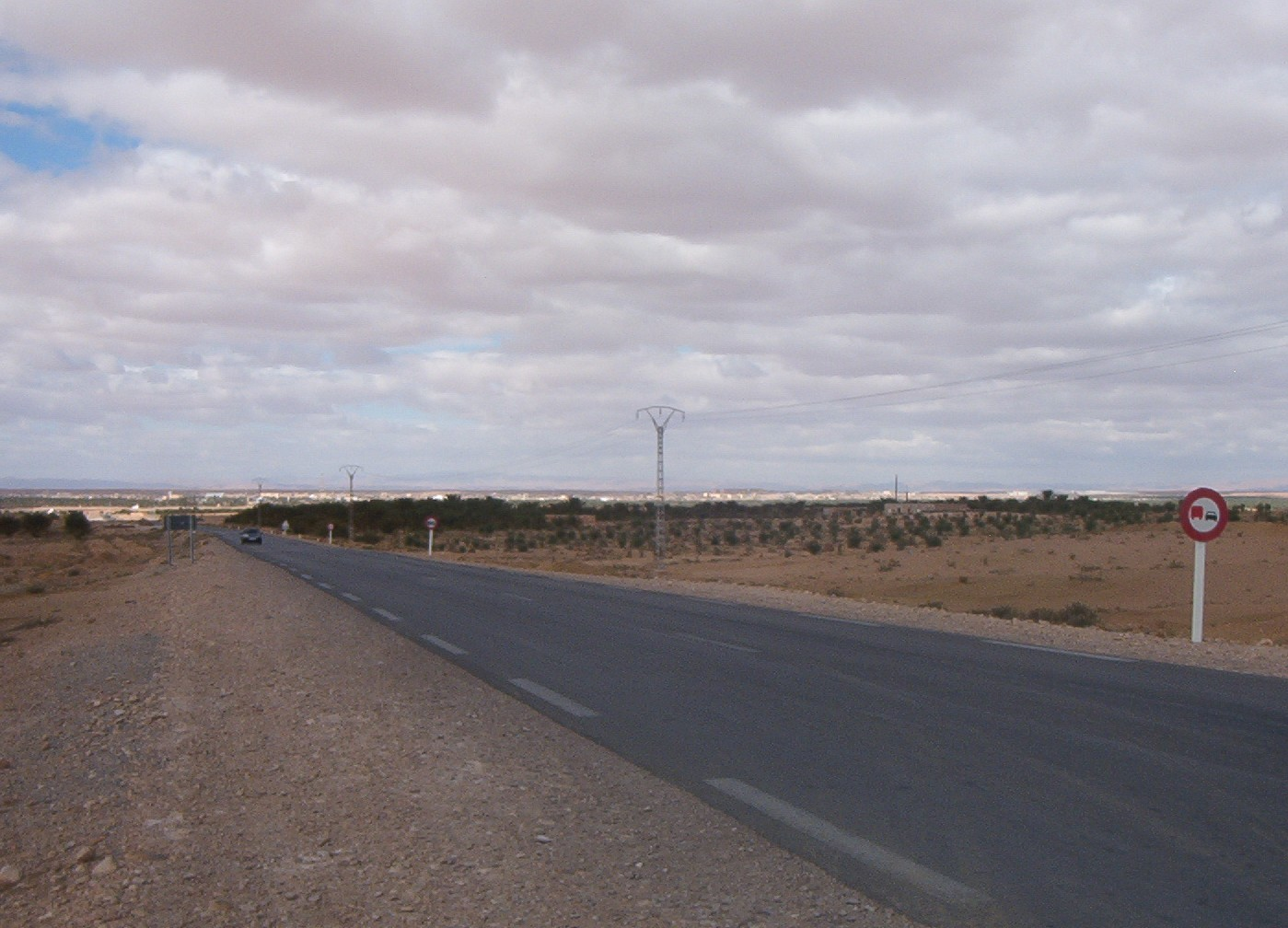
- Ouled Djellal
- Interactive map of Ouled Djellal
- Country: Algeria
- Province: Ouled Djellal Province

Population (2008)
  - Total: 63,237
- Time zone: UTC+1 (CET)

Ouled Djellal is a town and commune in Ouled Djellal Province, Algeria. Prior to the creation of Ouled Djellal Province in 2019, Ouled Djellal was part of Biskra Province. According to the 1998 census it had a population of 45,622.
