= Annals of Sargon II =

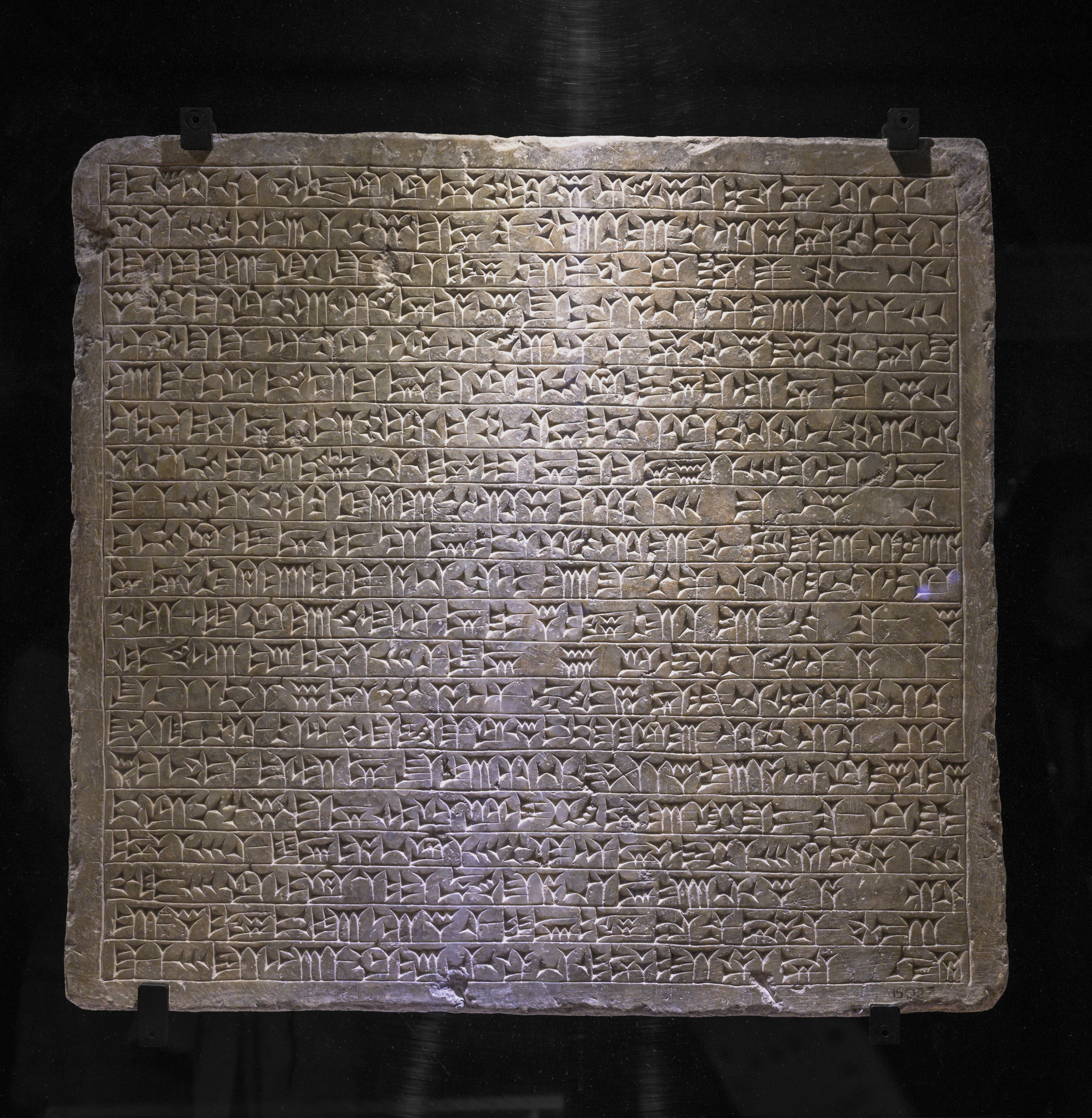
- Date: 720 BCE – 705 BCE
- Location: Khorsabad, Assyria

The Annals of Sargon II are a series of cuneiform inscriptions detailing the military actions of the Assyrian ruler Sargon II between 720 BCE and 705 BCE.

== Discovery ==
The Annals were unearthed in Khorsabad between 1842 and 1844 by archeologists Paul-Émile Botta and Eugène Flandin. Botta and Flandin published their findings in 1849, in a paper entitled Les Monuments de Ninive. Botta and Flandin could not read cuneiform, and so translations of the text were reliant on Botta's copies; the first major translation was made by Hugo Winckler and published as Keitshrifttexte Sargons in 1889.

== Content ==
The Annals cover an eleven-year campaign against a number of Assyrian vassal states, divided by the years of Sargon II's reign.

=== Major events covered ===
==== 720 BC (the General Inscription) ====
In response to Samaria's refusal to pay taxes and attempt to cede from Assyrian rule, Sargon conquers Samaria, taking many prisoners. He subsequently repopulates the area with displaced citizens of other conquered territories:

At the beginning of my royal rule, I…the town of the Samarians I besieged, conquered (2 Lines destroyed) [for the god…] who let me achieve this my triumph… I led away as prisoners [27,290 inhabitants of it (and) equipped from among them (soldiers to man)] 50 chariots for my royal corps… The town I rebuilt better than it was before and settled therein people from countries which I had conquered. I placed an officer of mine as governor over them and imposed upon them tribute as is customary for Assyrian citizens.

==== 720 BCE ====
Yahu-Bihdi, a Hittite, establishes allegiances with Arvad, Simirra, Damascus and Samaria and declares independence from Assyria. Sargon captures him after laying siege to the city of Qarqar (Karkar), burning the city to the ground and executing Yahu-Bihdi by flaying.

==== 714 BCE ====
Sargon attacks a number of Arabic tribes, including the Thamud, Ephah, Ibadidi and Marsimani; deporting the survivors of his campaign to Samaria.

==== 711 BCE ====
Sargon deposes Aziru, king of Ashdod and puts Aziru's brother Ahimiti on the throne. The Hittites revolt against this edict; Sargon in response lays siege to Ashdod, conquering it and making it a vassal state.

== See also ==
- Sargon II's Prism A
