= Ephah =

Biblical character

Ephah (/ˈiːfə/, Hebrew: עֵיפָה ʿĒp̄ā, Septuagint Γαιφα, Gaipha) was one of Midian's five sons as listed in the Hebrew Bible, and the namesake of an ancient Arabian tribe.

== Biblical account ==
Midian, a son of Abraham and Keturah, was the father of Ephah, Epher, Enoch, Abida, and Eldaah. These five were the progenitors of the Midianites.

Midian and Ephah are also mentioned in Isaiah 60:6 as transporters of gold and frankincense from Sheba, who would thus bring enlargement to Judah and praise to Yahweh. Ephah is described as a land whence dromedaries would come to Israel: "A multitude of camels shall cover you, the young camels of Midian and Ephah."

== Assyrian records ==
The tribe of Ephah is mentioned in inscriptions of the 8th-century BC Assyrian kings Tiglath-Pileser III and Sargon II, making it the only tribe of the Midianites to be attested outside of the Bible. Tiglath-Pileser's inscription calls them Ḫa-a-a-ap-pa-a-a, Sargon's Ḫa-ia-pa-a. This is consistent with the original Hebrew implied by the Septuagint, עֵ׳יפָה, Ghaiphah. Alongside the Adbeel, Massa, Tema and Sheba, they submitted to Tiglath-Pileser and paid tribute after a military campaign in southern Palestine. In the Annals of Sargon II, they are mentioned alongside the Thamūd, Marsimani and Ibadidi as those defeated by the Assyrians and exiled to Samaria in 716. Ephah is the only name common to both lists. Since the tribes mentioned by Sargon lay at a greater distance from Palestine than those in Tiglath-Pileser's inscription, it can be surmised that the Ephah were the closest to Palestine of these Arabian tribes. Presumably, they lived along the incense trade route, hence the reference to trade in Isaiah. Their land cannot be pinpointed but it may have been Yathrib (Medina) or Ḥismā.

== Other uses ==
In the Bible, the name Ephah is also used of a concubine of Caleb (1 Chronicles 2:46) and a son of Jahdai, a descendant of Judah (1 Chronicles 2:47).
