= Sargon II =

King of the Neo-Assyrian Empire, 722–705 BC

- King of Assyria; King of Babylon; King of Sumer and Akkad; King of the Four Corners of the World; King of the Universe
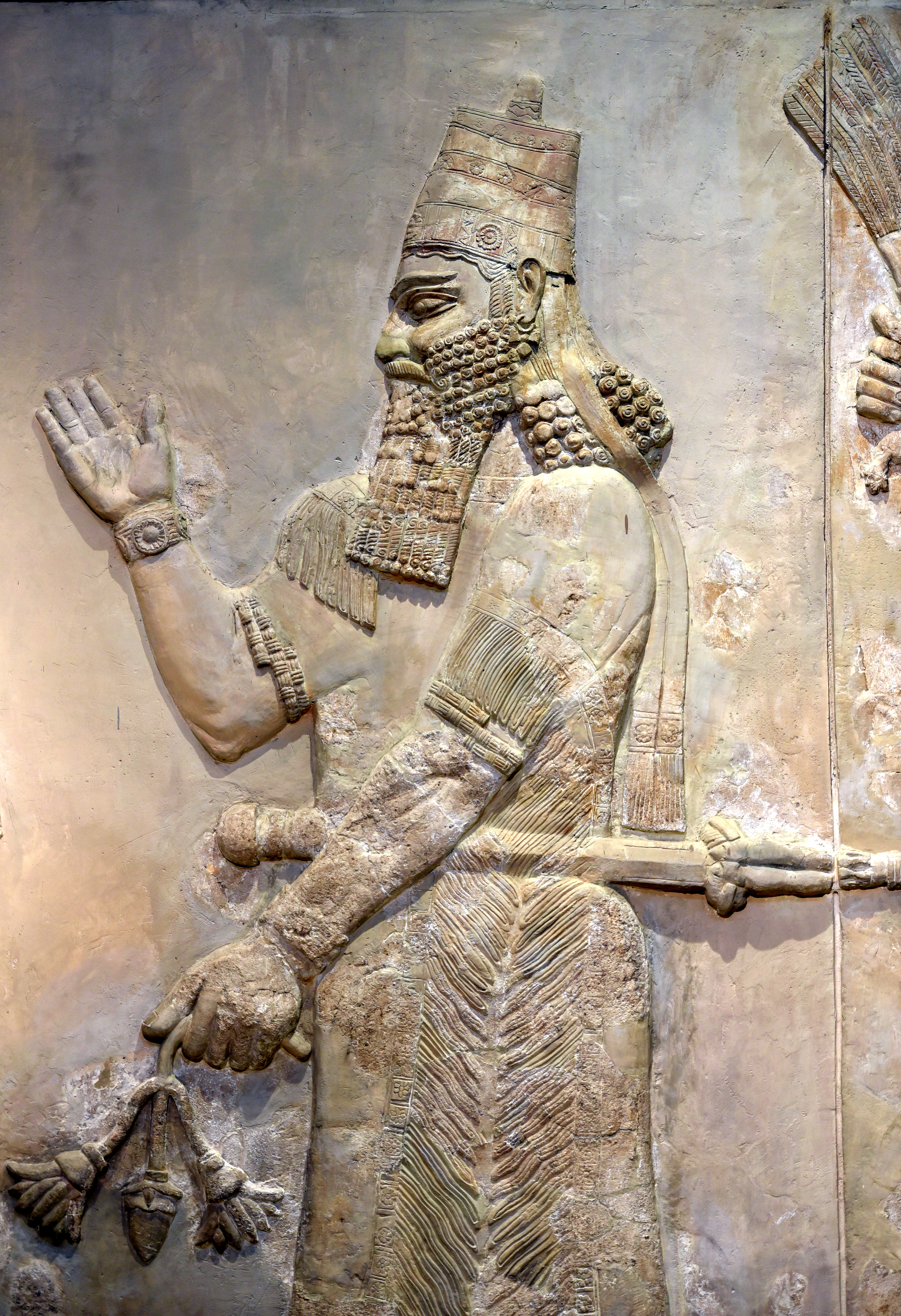
- Alabaster bas-relief depicting Sargon II, from his palace in Dur-Sharrukin

King of the Neo-Assyrian Empire
- Reign: 722–705 BC
- Predecessor: Shalmaneser V
- Successor: Sennacherib
- Born: c. 770–760 BC
- Died: 705 BC (aged c. 55–65); Tabal (modern-day Turkey)
- Spouse: Ra'īmâ; Atalia
- Issue: Sennacherib; Ahat-abisha; At least four others
- Akkadian: Šarru-kīn
- Dynasty: Sargonid dynasty
- Father: Tiglath-Pileser III (?)
- Mother: Iaba (?)

Sargon II (Neo-Assyrian Akkadian: 𒈗𒁺, romanized: Šarru-kīn, meaning "the faithful king" or "the legitimate king") was the king of the Neo-Assyrian Empire from 722 BC to his death in battle in 705. Most likely the son of Tiglath-Pileser III (r. 745–727), Sargon is generally believed to have become king after overthrowing Shalmaneser V (r. 727–722), most likely his brother. He is typically considered the founder of a new dynastic line, the Sargonid dynasty.

Modelling his reign on the legends of the ancient rulers Sargon of Akkad, from whom Sargon II likely took his regnal name, and Gilgamesh, Sargon aspired to conquer the known world, initiate a golden age and a new world order, and be remembered and revered by future generations. Over the course of his seventeen-year reign, Sargon substantially expanded Assyrian territory and enacted important political and military reforms. An accomplished warrior-king and military strategist, Sargon personally led his troops into battle. By the end of his reign, all of his major enemies and rivals had been either defeated or pacified. Among Sargon's greatest accomplishments were the continued Assyrian control over the Levant, the weakening of the northern kingdom of Urartu, and the reconquest of Babylonia. From 717 to 707, Sargon constructed a new Assyrian capital named after himself, Dur-Sharrukin ('Fort Sargon'), which he made his official residence in 706.

Sargon considered himself divinely mandated to maintain justice. Like other Assyrian kings, Sargon at times enacted brutal punishments against his enemies, but there are no known cases of atrocities against civilians from his reign. He worked to assimilate and integrate conquered foreign peoples into the empire and to extend to them the same rights and obligations as native Assyrians. He forgave defeated enemies on several occasions and maintained good relations with foreign kings and with the ruling classes of the lands he conquered. Sargon also increased the influence and status of both women and scribes at the royal court.

Sargon embarked on his final campaign, against Tabal in Anatolia, in 705. He was killed in battle, and the Assyrian army was unable to retrieve his body, preventing a traditional burial. According to ancient Mesopotamian religion, he was cursed to remain a restless ghost for eternity. Sargon's fate was a major psychological blow for the Assyrians and damaged his legacy. Sargon's son Sennacherib was deeply disturbed by his father's death and believed that he must have committed some grave sin. As a result, Sennacherib distanced himself from Sargon. Sargon was barely mentioned in later ancient literature and nearly completely forgotten until the ruins of Dur-Sharrukin were discovered in the 19th century. He was not fully accepted in Assyriology as a real king until the 1860s. Due to his conquests and reforms, Sargon is today considered one of the most important Assyrian kings.

== Background ==
=== Ancestry and rise to the throne ===
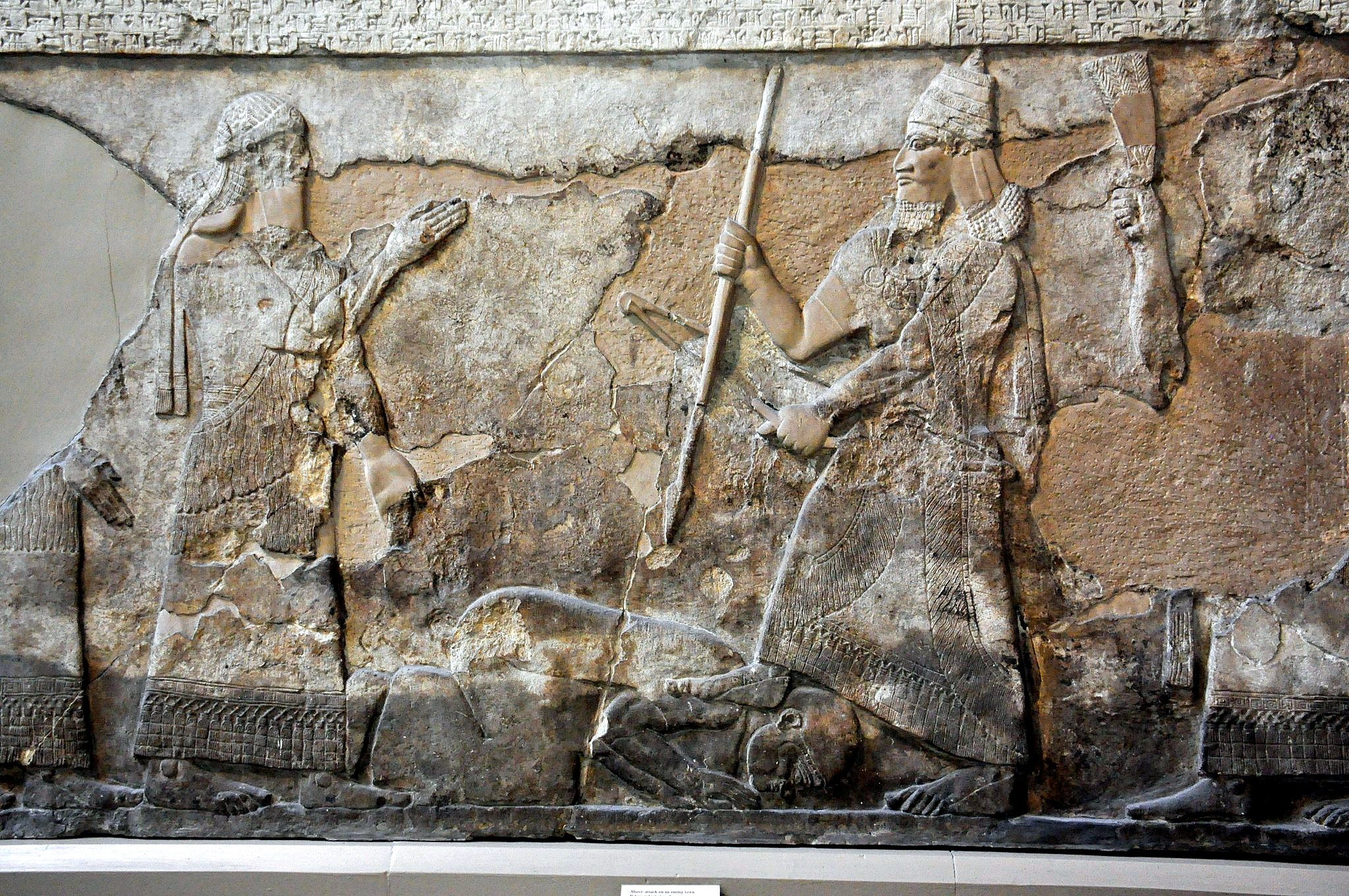
Relief from Nimrud depicting Sargon II's probable father Tiglath-Pileser III (r. 745–727 BC; right) and possibly also his probable brother Shalmaneser V (r. 727–722 BC; left)

Nothing is known of Sargon II's life before he became king. He was probably born c. 770 BC and cannot have been born later than c. 760 BC. (Note: Sargon's son and successor, Sennacherib (r. 705–681), had a son named Ashur-nadin-shumi, who was proclaimed vassal king of Babylon in 700. To be king, Ashur-nadin-shumi cannot have been younger than twenty. Because Assyrians tended to marry between the age of 26 and 32 (though royals might have married earlier), Sennacherib was probably born c. 745 (at the latest c. 740). Sennacherib was not Sargon's eldest son, which pushes Sargon's date of birth to c. 770 (at the latest c. 760).) His reign was immediately preceded by those of Tiglath-Pileser III (r. 745–727) and Tiglath-Pileser's son, Shalmaneser V (r. 727–722). Although Sargon is generally regarded as the founder of a new dynastic line, the Sargonid dynasty, he was probably a scion of the incumbent Adaside dynasty. Sargon grew up during the reigns of Ashur-dan III (r. 773–755) and Ashur-nirari V (r. 755–745), when rebellion and plague affected the Neo-Assyrian Empire; the prestige and power of Assyria dramatically declined. This trend reversed during the tenure of Tiglath-Pileser, who reduced the influence of powerful officials, reformed the army and more than doubled the size of the empire. In contrast to Tiglath-Pileser, little is recorded of Shalmaneser's brief reign.

Whereas kings typically elaborated on their origin in inscriptions, Sargon stated that the Assyrian national deity Ashur had called him to the throne. Sargon mentioned his origin in just two known inscriptions, where he referred to himself as Tiglath-Pileser's son, and in the Borowski Stele, probably from Hama in Syria, which referenced his "royal fathers". Most historians cautiously accept that Sargon was Tiglath-Pileser's son but not the legitimate heir to the throne as the next-in-line after Shalmaneser. If Sargon was Tiglath-Pileser's son, his mother might have been the queen Iaba. Some Assyriologists, such as Natalie Naomi May, have suggested that Sargon was a member of a collateral branch of the Adaside dynasty from the western part of the empire. In Babylonia, Sargon and his successors were considered part of the "dynasty of Hanigalbat" (a western territory), while earlier Assyrian kings were considered part of the "dynasty of Baltil" (Baltil being the name of the oldest portion of the ancient Assyrian capital of Assur). Perhaps Sargon was connected to a junior branch of the royal dynasty established at Hanigalbat centuries earlier. Some Assyriologists, such as John Anthony Brinkman, believe that Sargon did not belong to the direct dynastic lineage.

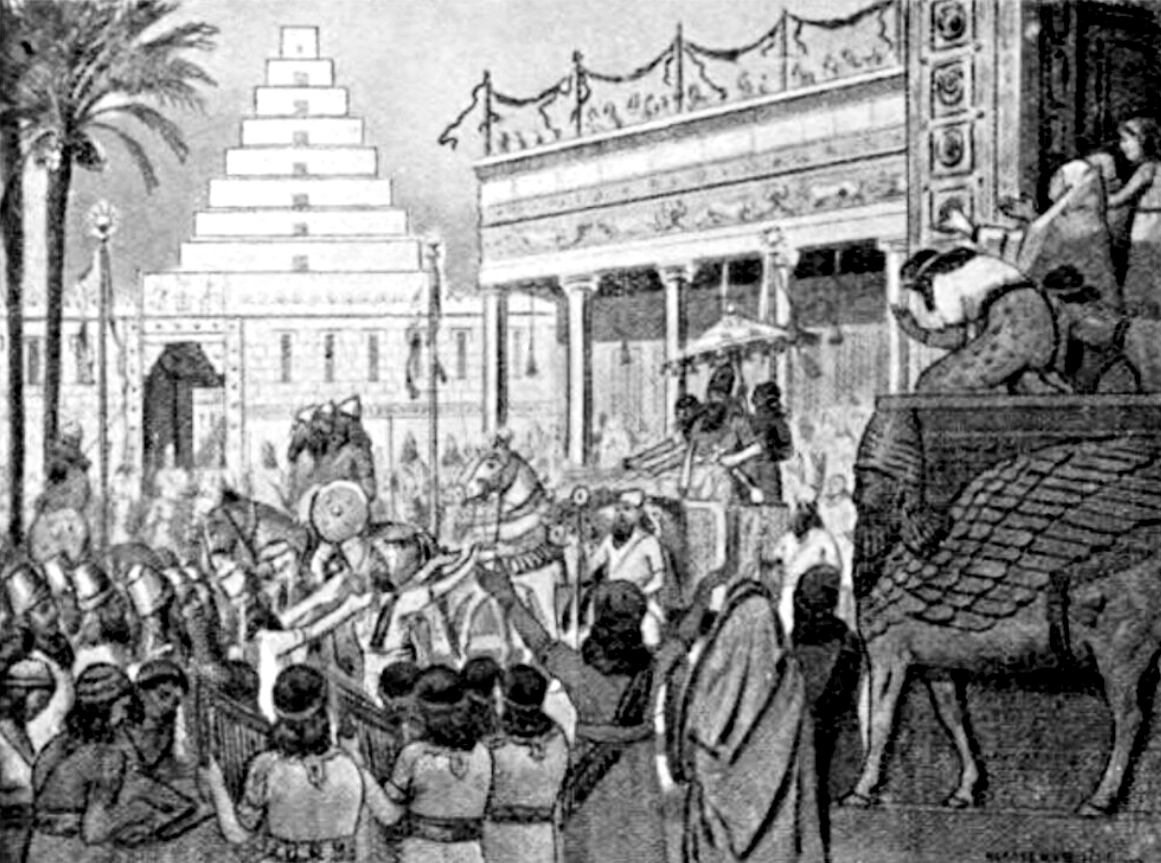
20th-century illustration of Sargon being proclaimed king in 722 BC

The Babylonian Chronicles report that Shalmaneser died in January 722 and was succeeded in the same month by Sargon, who was between forty and fifty years old. The exact events surrounding his accession are not clear. Some historians such as Josette Elayi believe that Sargon legitimately inherited the throne. Most scholars however believe him to have been a usurper; one theory is that Sargon killed Shalmaneser and seized the throne in a palace coup. Sargon rarely referenced his predecessors and, upon accession, faced massive domestic opposition. Shalmaneser probably had sons of his own who could have inherited the throne, such as the palace official Ashur-dain-aplu, who retained a prominent position under the Sargonid kings. Sargon's only known reference to Shalmaneser describes Ashur punishing him for his policies:

Shalmaneser, who did not fear the king of the world, whose hands have brought sacrilege in this city (Assur), pu[t on...] on his people, [he] impo[sed] the compulsory work and a heavy corvée, paid them like a working class [...]. The Illil of the gods, in the wrath of his heart, overthrew [hi]s rule, and [appointed] me, Sargon, as king [of Assyria]. He raised my head; he let [me] take hold of the scepter, the throne (and) the tiara [...].

Sargon did not otherwise hold Shalmaneser responsible for the policies placed on Assur, since he wrote elsewhere that most of these had been enacted in the distant past. Tiglath-Pileser, not Shalmaneser, imposed forced labor on the residents of Assur. Several of Shalmaneser's policies and acts were revoked by Sargon. Hullî, a king in Tabal (a region in Anatolia) deported by Shalmaneser, was reinstalled and Sargon reversed Shalmaneser's attempt to decrease trade with Egypt.

=== Name ===
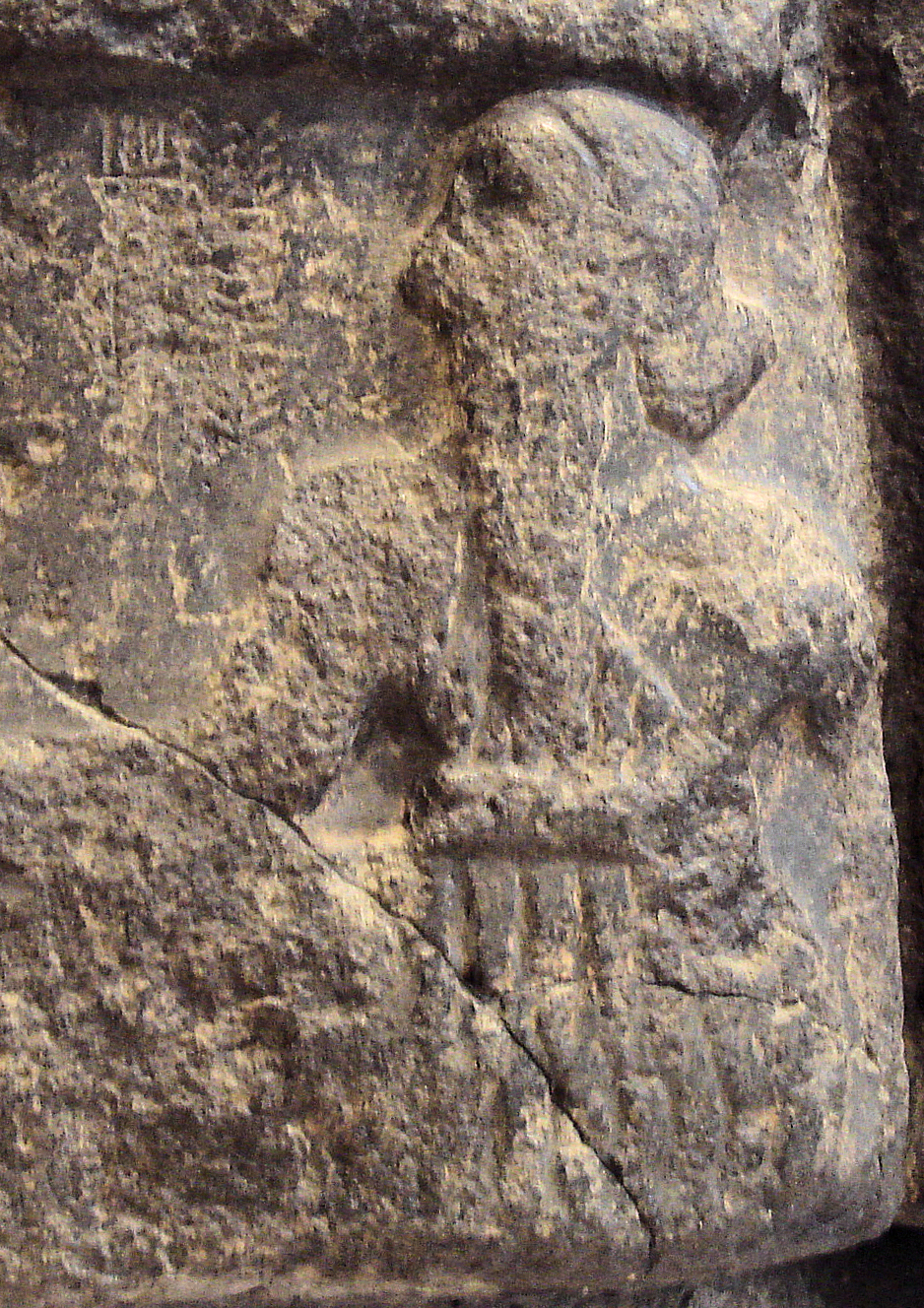
Sargon of Akkad (c. 2334–2279 BC) as depicted on his victory stele. Sargon II likely took his regnal name from this ancient king and sought to emulate his exploits.

Sargon II was the first king in more than a thousand years to bear the name Sargon. There were two Mesopotamian kings of the same name before his reign: Sargon I, a minor Assyrian king of the 19th century BC (after whom Sargon II is enumerated by modern historians), and the far more prominent 24th–23rd century BC Sargon of Akkad, conqueror of large parts of Mesopotamia and the founder of the Akkadian Empire. Sargon was probably an assumed regnal name. Royal names in ancient Mesopotamia were deliberate choices, setting the tone for a king's reign. Sargon most likely chose the name due to its use by Sargon of Akkad. In late Assyrian texts, the names of Sargon II and Sargon of Akkad are written with the same spelling. Sargon II is sometimes explicitly called the "second Sargon" (Šarru-kīn arkû). Though the precise extent of the ancient Sargon's conquests had been forgotten, the legendary ruler was still remembered as a "conqueror of the world". Sargon II also energetically pursued the expansion of his own empire.

In addition to the name's historical connections, Sargon connected his regnal name to justice. In several inscriptions, Sargon described his name as akin to a divine mandate to ensure that his people lived just lives, for instance in an inscription in which Sargon described how he reimbursed the owners of the land he chose to construct his new capital city of Dur-Sharrukin on:

In accordance with the name which the great gods have given me – to maintain justice and right, to give guidance to those who are not strong, not to injure the weak – the price of the fields of that town [Khorsabad] I paid back to their owners ...

The name was most commonly written Šarru-kīn, although Šarru-ukīn, is also attested. Sargon's name is commonly interpreted as "the faithful king" in the sense of righteousness and justice, from Akkadian šarru 'king' and kēnu 'faithful, righteous, loyal'. Another alternative is that Šarru-kīn is a phonetic reproduction of the contracted pronunciation of Šarru-ukīn to Šarrukīn, which means that it should be interpreted as "the king has obtained/established order", possibly referencing disorder either under his predecessor or caused by Sargon's usurpation. Šarru-kīn can also be interpreted as "the legitimate king" or "the true king" (the Akkadian word kēnu also means 'true, legitimate') and it could have been chosen because Sargon was not the legitimate heir to the throne. The ancient Sargon of Akkad also became king through usurpation. The origin of the conventional modern version of the name, Sargon, is not entirely clear but it is probably based on the spelling in the Hebrew Bible (srgwn): "Sargon [סַרְגּוֹן] king of Assyria" appears in Isaiah 20:1.

== Reign ==
=== Early reign and rebellions ===
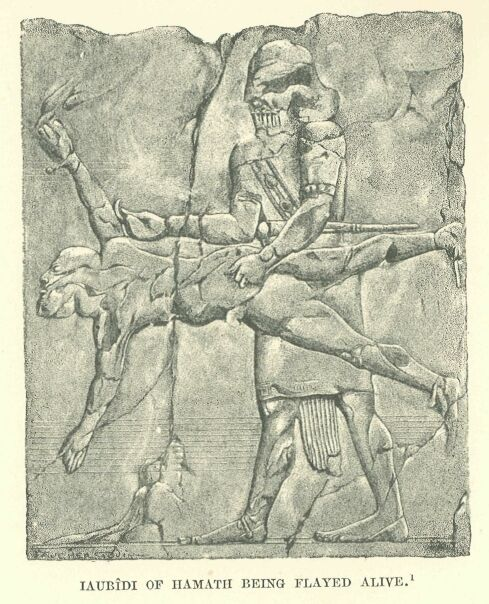
1903 illustration of a relief from Dur-Sharrukin depicting the rebel Yahu-Bihdi being flayed alive.

Sargon's reign began with large-scale resistance against his rule in Assyria's heartland. Although quickly suppressed, this political instability led several peripheral regions to regain independence. In early 721, Marduk-apla-iddina II, a Chaldean warlord of the Bit-Yakin tribe, captured Babylon, restored Babylonian independence after eight years of Assyrian rule and allied with the eastern realm of Elam. Though Sargon considered Marduk-apla-iddina's seizure of Babylonia to be unacceptable, an attempt to defeat him in battle near Der in 720 was unsuccessful. At the same time, Yahu-Bihdi of Hama in Syria assembled a coalition of minor states in the northern Levant to oppose Assyrian dominion.

In addition to these revolts, Sargon may have had to deal with unfinished conflicts from Shalmaneser's reign. At some point in the 720s, the Assyrians captured Samaria after a siege lasting several years and ended the Kingdom of Israel, with its territory becoming the new Assyrian province of Samerina. Sargon claimed to have conquered the city, but it is more likely that Shalmaneser captured the city since both the Babylonian Chronicles and the Hebrew Bible viewed the fall of Israel as the signature event of his reign. Sargon's claim to conquering it may be related to the city being captured again after Yahu-Bihdi's revolt. Either Shalmaneser or Sargon ordered the dispersal of the city of Samaria's population across the Assyrian Empire, following the standard resettlement policy. This specific resettlement resulted in the loss of the Ten Lost Tribes of Israel. In his inscriptions, Sargon claimed to have resettled 27,280 Israelites. Though likely emotionally damaging for the resettled populace, the Assyrians valued deportees for their labor and generally treated them well, transporting them in safety and comfort together with their families and belongings.

Shortly after his failure to retake Babylonia from Marduk-apla-iddina in 720, Sargon campaigned against Yahu-Bihdi. Among Yahu-Bihdi's supporters were the cities of Arpad, Damascus, Sumur and Samaria. Three of the cities participating in the revolt (Arpad, Sumur and Damascus) were not vassal states; their lands had been converted into Assyrian provinces governed by royally appointed Assyrian governors. The revolt threatened to undo the administrative system established in Syria by Sargon's predecessors and the insurgents went on a killing spree, murdering all local Assyrians they could find.

Sargon engaged Yahu-Bihdi and his coalition at Qarqar on the Orontes. Defeated, Yahu-Bihdi escaped into Qarqar, which Sargon besieged and captured. Sargon's army destroyed Qarqar and devastated the surrounding lands. Yahu-Bihdi was first deported to Assyria together with his family and then flayed alive. Hama and the other insurgent cities were annexed again. At the same time as large numbers of people from Syria were resettled in other parts of the empire, Sargon resettled some people to Syria, including 6,300 "guilty Assyrians", presumably Assyrians from the heartland who had fought against Sargon upon his accession but whose lives had been spared. Sargon described their resettlement as an act of mercy: "their transgression I disregarded, I had mercy on them".

Around the same time as Yahu-Bihdi, Hanunu of Gaza in the south also rebelled against Assyria. After Sargon had defeated Yahu-Bihdi, he marched south. After capturing some other cities on his way, probably including Ekron and Gibbethon, the Assyrians defeated Hanunu, whose army had been bolstered by allies from Egypt, at Rafah. Despite the transgression, Gaza was kept as a semi-autonomous vassal state and not outright annexed, perhaps because the location, on the border of Egypt, was of high strategic importance.

=== Proxy wars and minor conflicts ===
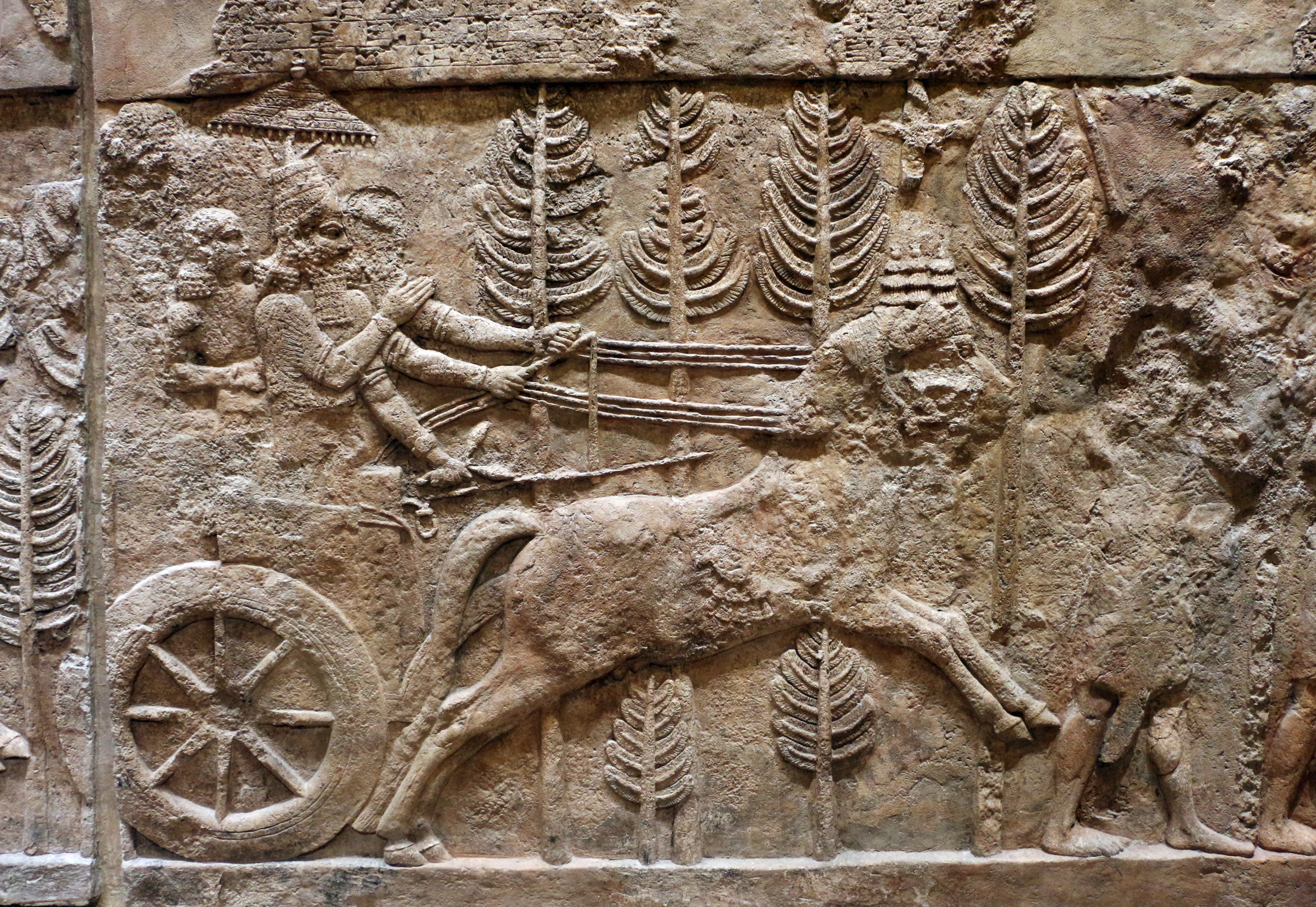
Sargon depicted in a chariot in one of the reliefs from his palace in Dur-Sharrukin.

A pressing concern for Sargon was the kingdom of Urartu in the north. Though no longer as powerful as it had been in the past, when it at times rivalled Assyria in strength and influence, Urartu still remained an alternative suzerain for many smaller states in the north. In 718, Sargon intervened in Mannaea, one of these states. This campaign was as much a military effort as it was a diplomatic one; King Iranzu of Mannaea had been an Assyrian vassal for more than 25 years and had requested Sargon to aid him. A rebellion by the Urartu-aligned noble Mitatti occupied half of Iranzu's kingdom, but thanks to Sargon, Mitatti's uprising was suppressed. Shortly after the victory over the rebels, Iranzu died and Sargon intervened in the succession, supporting Iranzu's son Aza rise to the throne of Mannaea. Another son, Ullusunu, contested his brother's accession and was supported in his efforts against him by Rusa I of Urartu.

Another of Sargon's prominent foreign enemies was the powerful and expansionist Midas of Phrygia in central Anatolia. Sargon worried about a possible alliance between Phrygia and Urartu and Midas' use of proxy warfare by encouraging Assyrian vassal states to rebel. Sargon could not fight against Midas directly but had to deal with uprisings by his vassals among the Syro-Hittite states, most of them located in remote locations in the mountains of southern Anatolia. It was crucial to keep control over the regions of Tabal and Quwê to prevent communication between Midas and Rusa. Tabal—several minor states competing with each other, contested between Assyria, Phrygia and Urartu—was particularly important since it was rich in natural resources (including silver). Sargon campaigned against Tabal in 718, mostly against Kiakki of Shinuhtu, who withheld tribute and conspired with Midas. Sargon could not conquer Tabal because of its isolation and difficult terrain. Instead, Shinuhtu was given to a rival Tabalian ruler, Kurtî of Atunna. Kurtî conspired with Midas at some point between 718 and 713, but later maintained his allegiance to Sargon.

Sargon returned to Syria in 717 to defeat an uprising led by Pisiri of Carchemish, who had supported Sargon during Yahu-Bihdi's revolt but was now plotting with Midas to overthrow Assyrian hegemony in the region. The uprising was defeated and the population of Carchemish was deported and replaced with Assyrians. The city and its surrounding lands were turned into an Assyrian province and an Assyrian palace was constructed. The conquest might have inspired Sargon to build his own new capital city (Dur-Sharrukin), a project which could be financed with the silver plundered from Carchemish. Sargon took so much silver from Carchemish that silver began to replace copper as the currency of the empire. Despite Sargon's repeated victories in the west, the Levant was not fully stabilized.

Sargon established a new trading post near the border of Egypt in 716, staffed it with people deported from various conquered lands and placed it under the local Arab ruler Laban, an Assyrian vassal. In later writings, Sargon for unknown reasons falsely claimed that he in this year also subjugated the people of Egypt. In actuality, Sargon is recorded to have engaged in diplomacy with Pharaoh Osorkon IV, who gifted Sargon with twelve horses.

In 716, Sargon campaigned between Urartu and Elam, perhaps part of a strategy to weaken these enemies. Passing through Mannaea, Sargon attacked Media, probably to establish control there and neutralize the region as a potential threat before confronting either Urartu or Elam. The local Medes were disunited and posed no serious threat to Assyria. After Sargon defeated them and established Assyrian provinces, he let the established local lords continue to rule their respective cities as vassals. Supplanting them and integrating the lands further into the imperial bureaucracy would have been costly and time-consuming due to their remoteness. As part of this eastern campaign, Sargon defeated some local rebels, including Bag-dati of Uishdish and Bel-sharru-usur of Kisheshim. In Mannaea, Ullusunu had succeeded in taking the throne from his brother Aza. Instead of deposing Ullusunu and proclaiming a new king, Sargon accepted Ullusunu's submission and endorsed him as king, forgiving his uprising and gaining his allegiance.

=== Urartu–Assyria War ===
Urartu and the Assyrian frontier under Rusa I, from 715 to 713 BC.

Urartu remained Sargon's main strategic rival in the north. In 715, Urartu was severely weakened by an unsuccessful expedition against the Cimmerians, a nomadic people in the central Caucasus. The Cimmerians defeated the Urartian army and raided Urartian lands as far as immediately south-west of Lake Urmia. Ullusunu of Mannaea had switched by then his loyalty to Assyria. Rusa seized some of Ullusunu's fortresses and replaced him with Daiukku as the new king. Months later, Sargon invaded Mannaea, recaptured Ullusunu's fortresses and restored him to the throne. Rusa attempted to drive Sargon back, but his army was defeated in the foothills of Sahand. Sargon also received the tribute of Ianzu, king of Nairi, another former Urartian vassal. Preparing for a campaign against Rusa, Sargon defeated some minor rebels in Media. In Anatolia, Urik of Quwê, changed his allegiance from Sargon to Midas of Phrygia and began sending envoys to Rusa. To prevent the formation of a northern alliance, Sargon attacked Quwê, defeating Urik and recapturing some cities that had fallen to Midas. Quwê was abolished as a vassal kingdom and annexed.

Suspecting an Assyrian invasion, Rusa kept most of his army by Lake Urmia, close to the Assyrian border, which was already fortified against Assyrian invasion. The shortest path from Assyria to the Urartian heartland went through the Kel-i-šin pass in the Taurus Mountains. One of the most important places in all of Urartu, the holy city Musasir, was located just west of this pass and was protected by fortifications. Rusa ordered the construction of the Gerdesorah, a new fortress strategically positioned on a hill. The Gerdesorah was still under construction when the Assyrians invaded.

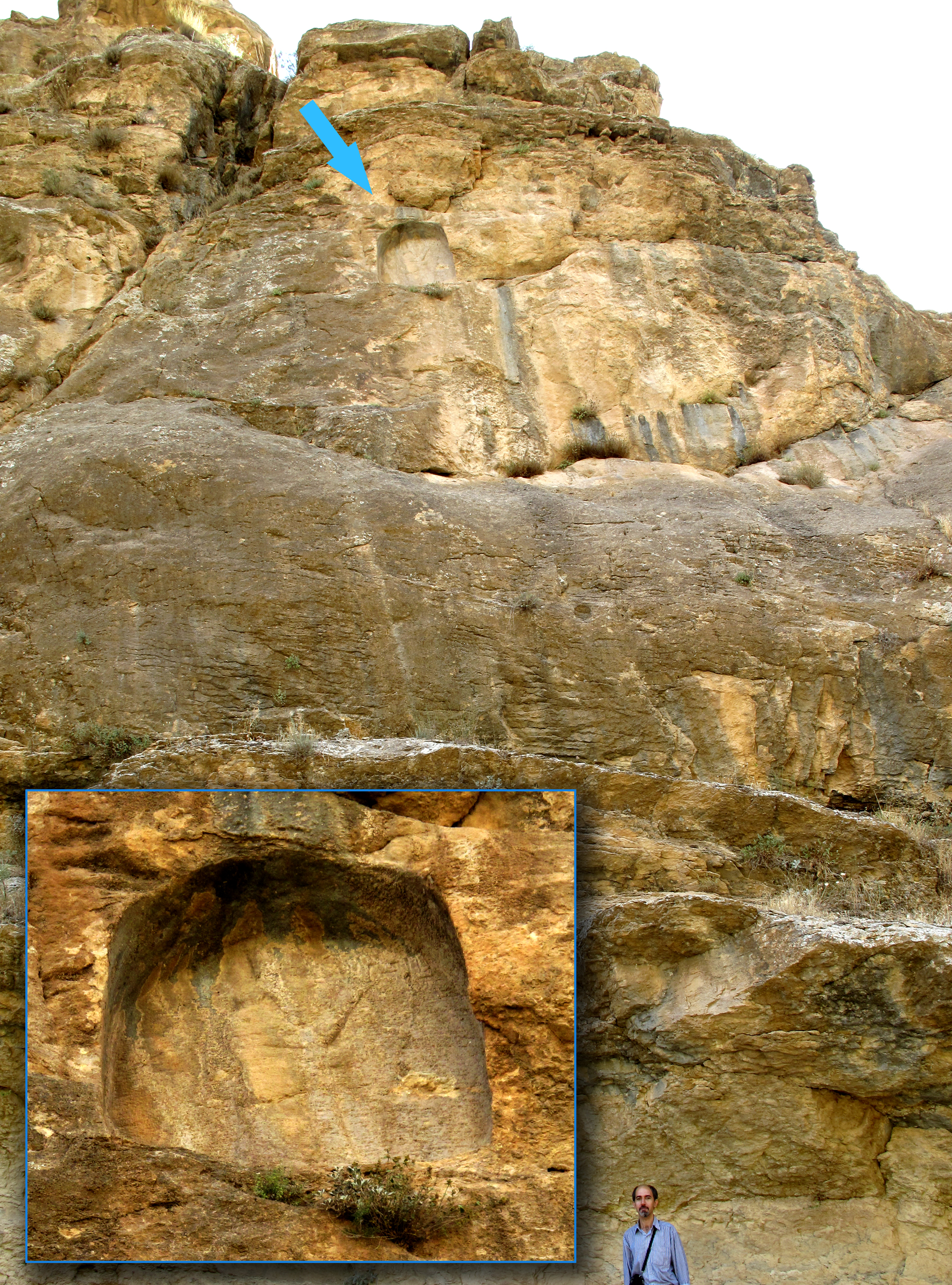
Inscription of Sargon at the Tang-i Var pass near the village of Tangivar, Hawraman, Iran.

Sargon left the Assyrian capital of Nimrud in July 714. Rejecting the shortest route through the Kel-i-šin pass, Sargon marched his army through the valleys of the Great and Little Zab for three days before halting near Mount Kullar (the location of which remains unidentified). There Sargon chose a longer route through Kermanshah, probably since he knew the Urartians anticipated him attacking through the pass. The longer route delayed the Assyrians with mountains and greater distance. The campaign had to be completed before October, when the mountain passes would become blocked by snow. This meant that conquest, if that had been the intention, would not be possible.

Sargon reached Gilzanu, near Lake Urmia, and made camp. The Urartian forces regrouped and built new fortifications west and south of Lake Urmia. Though Sargon's forces had been granted supplies and water by his vassals in Media, his troops were exhausted and nearly mutinous. When Rusa arrived, the Assyrian army refused to fight. Sargon assembled his bodyguards and led them in a near-suicidal charge against the nearest wing of the Urartian forces. Sargon's army defeated the Urartians at Mount Waush, and chased them west, far past Lake Urmia. Rusa abandoned his forces and fled into the mountains.

On their way home, the Assyrians destroyed the Gerdesorah and captured and plundered Musasir after the local governor, king Urzana, refused to welcome Sargon. An enormous quantity of spoils were carried back to Assyria. Urzana was forgiven and allowed to continue to govern Musasir as an Assyrian vassal. Though Urartu remained powerful and Rusa retook Musasir, the 714 campaign put an end to direct confrontations between Urartu and Assyria for the rest of Sargon's reign. Sargon considered the campaign one of the major events of his reign. It was described in exceptional detail in his inscriptions and several of the reliefs in his palace were decorated with representations of the sack of Musasir.

=== Construction of Dur-Sharrukin ===
Layout of Dur-Sharrukin, including the palace and the arsenal. Other than these structures, the city remains poorly excavated.

The foundations of Dur-Sharrukin ("fortress of Sargon") were laid in 717. Dur-Sharrukin was built between the Husur river and Mount Musri, near the village of Magganabba, around 16 kilometres (10 miles) northeast of Nineveh. The new city could use water from Mount Musri but the location otherwise lacked obvious practical or political merit. In one of his inscriptions, Sargon alluded to fondness for the foothills of Mount Musri: "following the prompting of my heart, I built a city at the foot of Mount Musri, in the plain of Nineveh, and named it Dur-Sharrukin". Since no buildings had ever been constructed at the chosen location, previous architecture did not have to be taken into account and he conceived the new city as an "ideal city", its proportions based on mathematical harmony. There were various numerical and geometrical correspondences between different aspects of the city and Dur-Sharrukin's city walls formed a nearly perfect square.

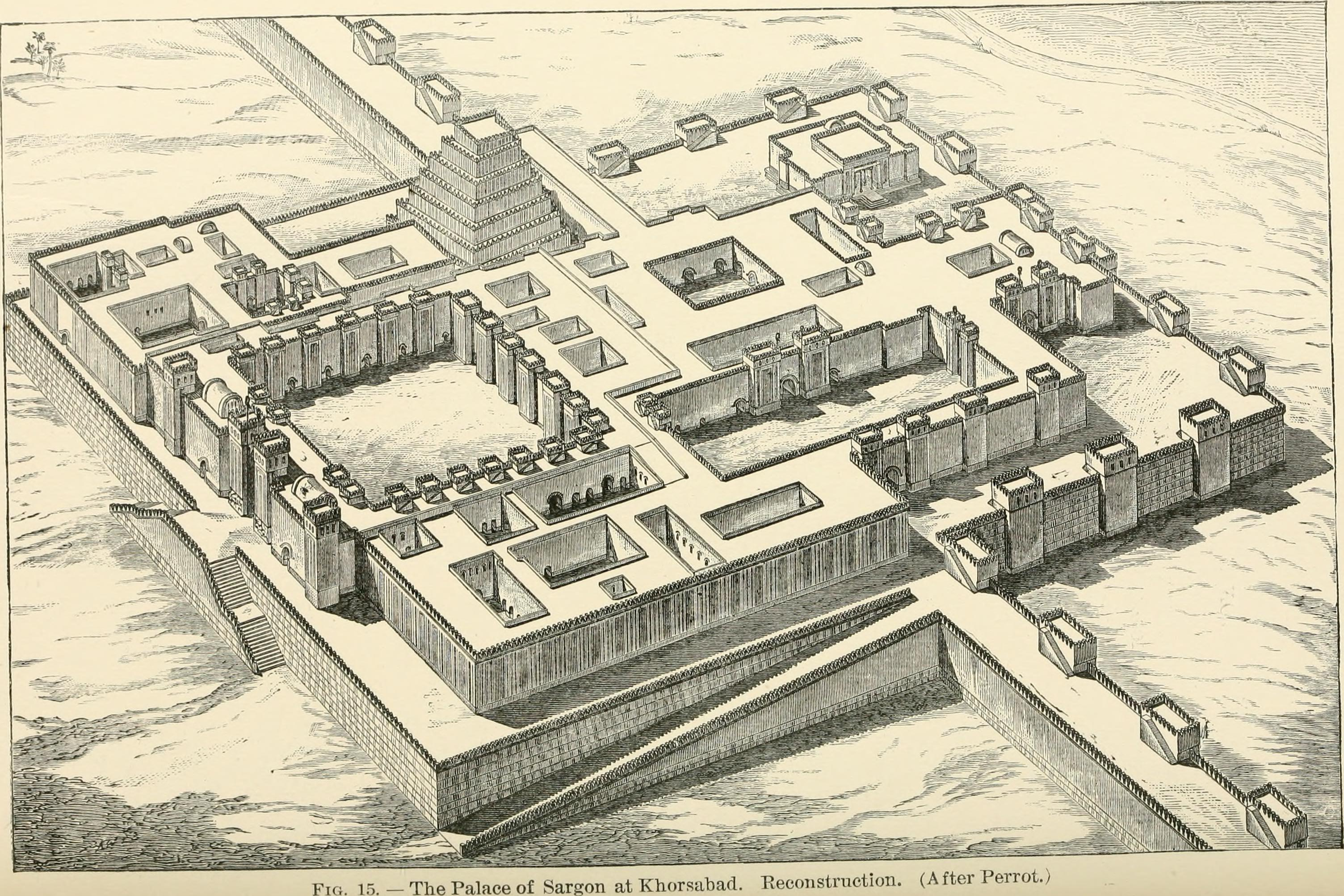
1905 reconstruction of Sargon's palace

The numerous surviving sources on the construction of the city include inscriptions carved on the walls of its buildings, reliefs depicting the process and over a hundred letters and other documents describing the work. The chief coordinator was Tab-shar-Ashur, Sargon's chief treasurer, but at least twenty-six governors from across the empire were also associated with the construction; Sargon made the project a collaborative effort by the whole empire. Sargon took an active personal interest in the progress and frequently intervened in nearly all aspects of the work, from commenting on architectural details to overseeing material transportation and the recruitment of labor. Sargon's frequent input and efforts to encourage more work is probably the main reason for how the city could be completed so fast and efficiently. Sargon's encouragement was at times lenient, particularly when dealing with grumbling among the workers, but at other times threatening. One of his letters to the governor of Nimrud, requesting building materials, reads as follows:

700 bales of straw and 700 bundles of reeds, and each bundle no more than a donkey can carry, must be at hand in Dur-Sharrukin by the first day of Kislev. Should even one day pass by, you will die.

Dur-Sharrukin reflected Sargon's self-image and how he wished the empire to see him. At about three square kilometers (1.2 square miles), the city was one of the largest in antiquity. The city's palace, which Sargon called a "palace without rival", (Note: The same name was later used by Sargon's son Sennacherib for a palace built in Nineveh.) was built on a huge artificial platform on the northern side of the city astride the wall, as was typical of Neo-Assyrian palaces, and was fortified with a wall of its own. At 100,000 square meters (10 hectares; 25 acres), it was the largest Assyrian palace ever built. The palace itself occupied three quarters of the citadel it was constructed on, while temples and the ziggurat were relegated to a single corner. It was richly decorated with reliefs, statues, glazed bricks and stone lamassus (human-headed bulls). Other prominent structures in the city included temples, a building in the southwest called the arsenal (ekal mâšarti), and a great park, which included exotic plants from throughout the empire. The city's surrounding wall was 20 metres (66 ft) high and 14 metres (46 ft) thick, reinforced at 15-meter (49 ft) intervals with more than two hundred bastions. The internal wall was named Ashur, the external wall Ninurta, the city's seven gates Shamash, Adad, Enlil, Anu, Ishtar, Ea and Belet-ili after gods of the Mesopotamian pantheon.

=== Further minor conflicts ===
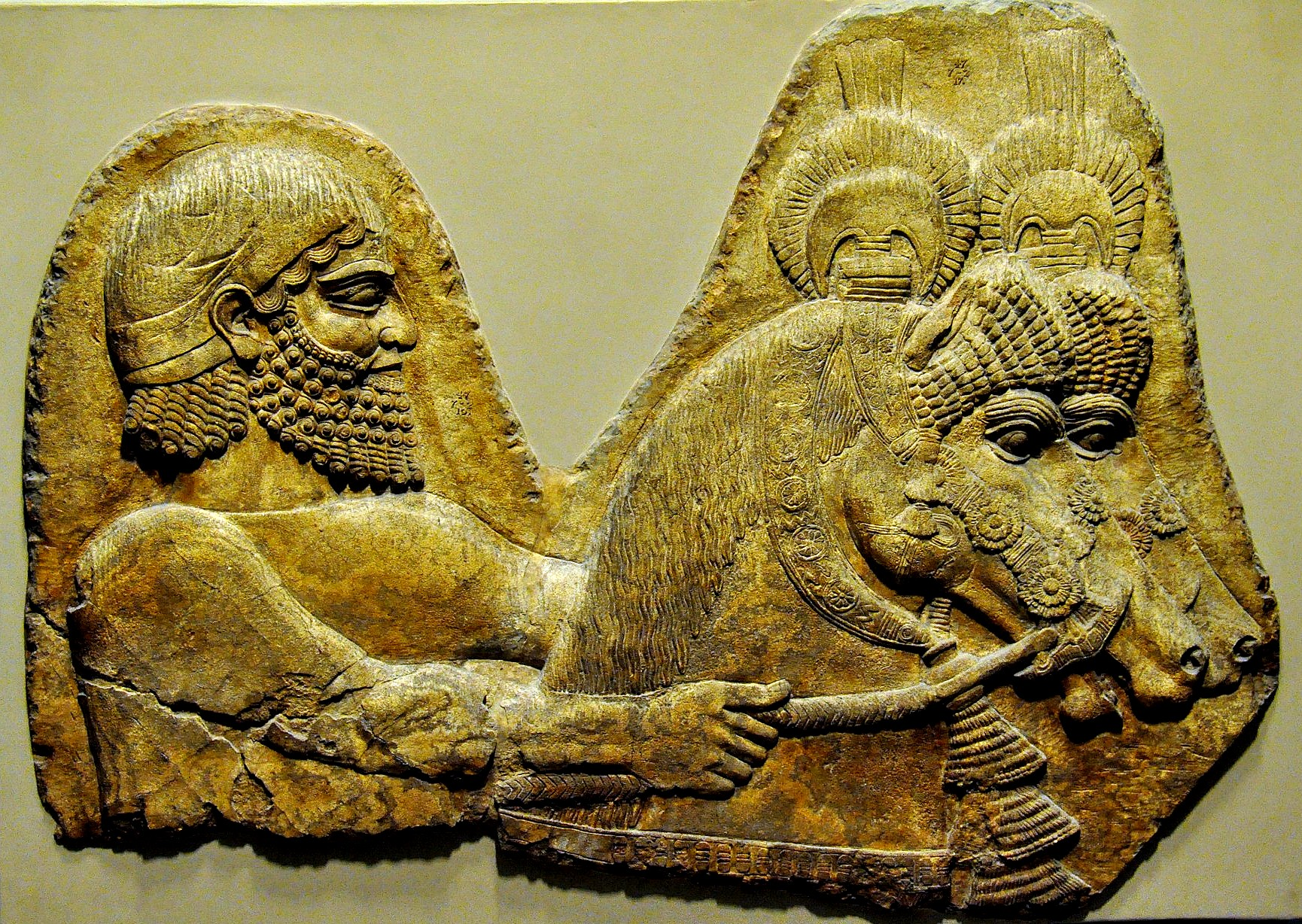
Relief from Dur-Sharrukin depicting two horses and their handler

In the years following the campaign against Urartu, Sargon worked to retain the loyalty of his northern vassals and to curb the influence of Elam; though Elam itself did not pose a threat towards Assyria, it would not be possible to reconquer Babylonia without first breaking Marduk-apla-iddina's alliance with the Elamites. In 713, Sargon campaigned in the Zagros Mountains again, defeating a revolt in the land of Karalla, meeting with Ullusunu of Mannaea and receiving some tribute. In the same year, Sargon sent his turtanu (commander-in-chief) to help Talta of Ellipi, an Assyrian vassal west of the Zagros Mountains. Sargon probably considered it important to keep good relations with Ellipi since it was a key buffer state between Assyria and Elam. Talta was threatened by a revolt, but after Assyrian intervention he retained his throne.

Rusa still intended to extend Urartian influence into southern Anatolia despite Sargon's 714 victory. In 713 Sargon campaigned against Tabal in southern Anatolia again, trying to secure the kingdom's natural resources (mainly silver and wood, required for the construction of Dur-Sharrukin) and to prevent Urartu from establishing control and contacting Phrygia. Sargon used a divide and rule approach in Tabal; territory was distributed between the different Tabalian rulers to prevent any one of them from growing strong enough to present a problem. Sargon also encouraged the loose hegemony of the strongest Tabalian state, Bit-Purutash (sometimes called "Tabal proper" by modern historians), over the other Tabalian rulers. The king of Bit-Purutash, Ambaris, was granted Sargon's daughter Ahat-Abisha in marriage and some additional territory. This strategy was not successful; Ambaris began conspiring with the other rulers of Tabal and with Rusa and Midas. Sargon deposed Ambaris, deporting him to Assyria, and annexed Tabal.

The Philistine city of Ashdod rebelled under its king Azuri in 713, and was crushed by Sargon or one of his generals. Azuri was replaced as king by Ahi-Miti. In 712 the vassal king Tarhunazi of Kammanu in northern Syria rebelled against Assyria, seeking to ally with Midas. Tarhunazi had been placed on his throne during Sargon's 720 campaign in the Levant. This revolt was dealt with by Sargon's turtanu; Tarhunazi was defeated and his lands were annexed. His capital, Melid, was given to Mutallu of Kummuh. Mutallu was a trusted ally since the kings of Kummuh had long maintained good relations with the Assyrian court. After the Assyrian army defeated a revolt by the kingdom of Gurgum in 711 and it was annexed, Sargon's control of southern Anatolia became relatively stable. Shortly after Sargon's victory, Ashdod revolted again. The locals deposed Ahi-Miti and in his stead proclaimed a noble named Yamani as king. In 712, Yamani approached Judah and Egypt for an alliance but the Egyptians refused Yamani's offer, maintaining good relations with Sargon. After the Assyrians defeated Yamani in 711 and Ashdod was destroyed, Yamani escaped to Egypt and was extradited to Assyria by Pharaoh Shebitku in 707.

=== Reconquest of Babylonia ===
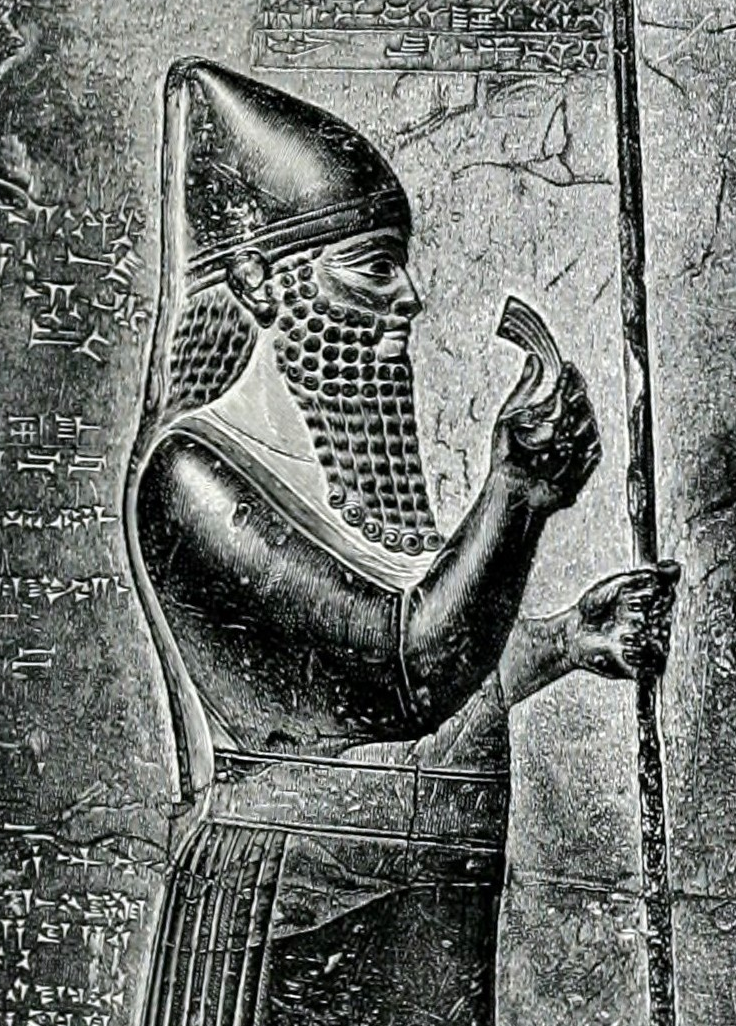
Marduk-apla-iddina II of Babylon, as depicted on one of his kudurrus (boundary stones)

In 710, Sargon decided to reconquer Babylonia. To justify the impending expedition, Sargon proclaimed that the Babylonian national deity Marduk had commanded him to liberate the south from the evil Marduk-apla-iddina. Though Babylonia and Elam still maintained good relations, the military alliance between the two had disintegrated. Sargon used diplomacy to convince cities and tribes within Babylonia to betray Marduk-apla-iddina. Through secret negotiations, several tribes and cities in northern Babylonia were won over, including the city of Sippar and the tribes Bit-Dakkuri and Bit-Amukkani.

Sargon invaded Babylonia by marching alongside the eastern bank of the river Tigris until he reached the city of Dur-Athara, which had been fortified by Marduk-apla-iddina (moving also the entire Gambulu tribe, an Aramean people, into it), but was quickly defeated and renamed Dur-Nabu. Sargon created a new province surrounding the city, Gambulu. Dur-Athara might have been seized specifically to prevent the Elamites from sending any significant aid to Marduk-apla-iddina. Sargon spent some time at Dur-Athara, sending his soldiers on expeditions to the east and south to convince cities and tribes to submit to his rule. Sargon's forces defeated a contingent of Aramean and Elamite soldiers by a river referred to as the Uknu. Once Sargon crossed the Tigris and one of the branches of the Euphrates and arrived at the city Dur-Ladinni, near Babylon, Marduk-apla-iddina became frightened. He may have had little support from the people and priesthood of Babylon or had lost most of his army at Dur-Athara. Marduk-apla-iddina fled to Elam, where he unsuccessfully petitioned King Shutruk-Nahhunte II for aid.

After Marduk-apla-iddina's departure, Sargon met little opposition on his march south. The people of Babylon opened the gates with enthusiasm and he made a triumphal entry. Elayi speculated in 2017 that Sargon may have made an agreement with the city's priests, who might have preferred Assyrian rule over a Chaldean king. After some ceremonies in the city, Sargon relocated with his army to Kish to continue the war and suppress remaining resistance. Marduk-apla-iddina returned to Mesopotamia, taking up residence in his home city of Dur-Yakin and continuing to resist.

Dur-Yakin was fortified, a great ditch was dug surrounding its walls, and the surrounding countryside was flooded through a canal dug from the Euphrates. Guarded by the flooded terrain, Marduk-apla-iddina set up his camp outside the city walls. His forces were defeated by Sargon's army, which had crossed through the flooded terrain unimpeded. Marduk-apla-iddina fled into the city as the Assyrians began collecting spoils of war from his fallen soldiers. Sargon besieged Dur-Yakin but was unable to take the city. As the siege dragged on, negotiations were started and in 709 it was agreed that the city would surrender and tear down its exterior walls in exchange for Sargon sparing Marduk-apla-iddina's life. Marduk-apla-iddina, along with his family and supporters, were granted passage to Elam to live in exile.

=== Last years ===
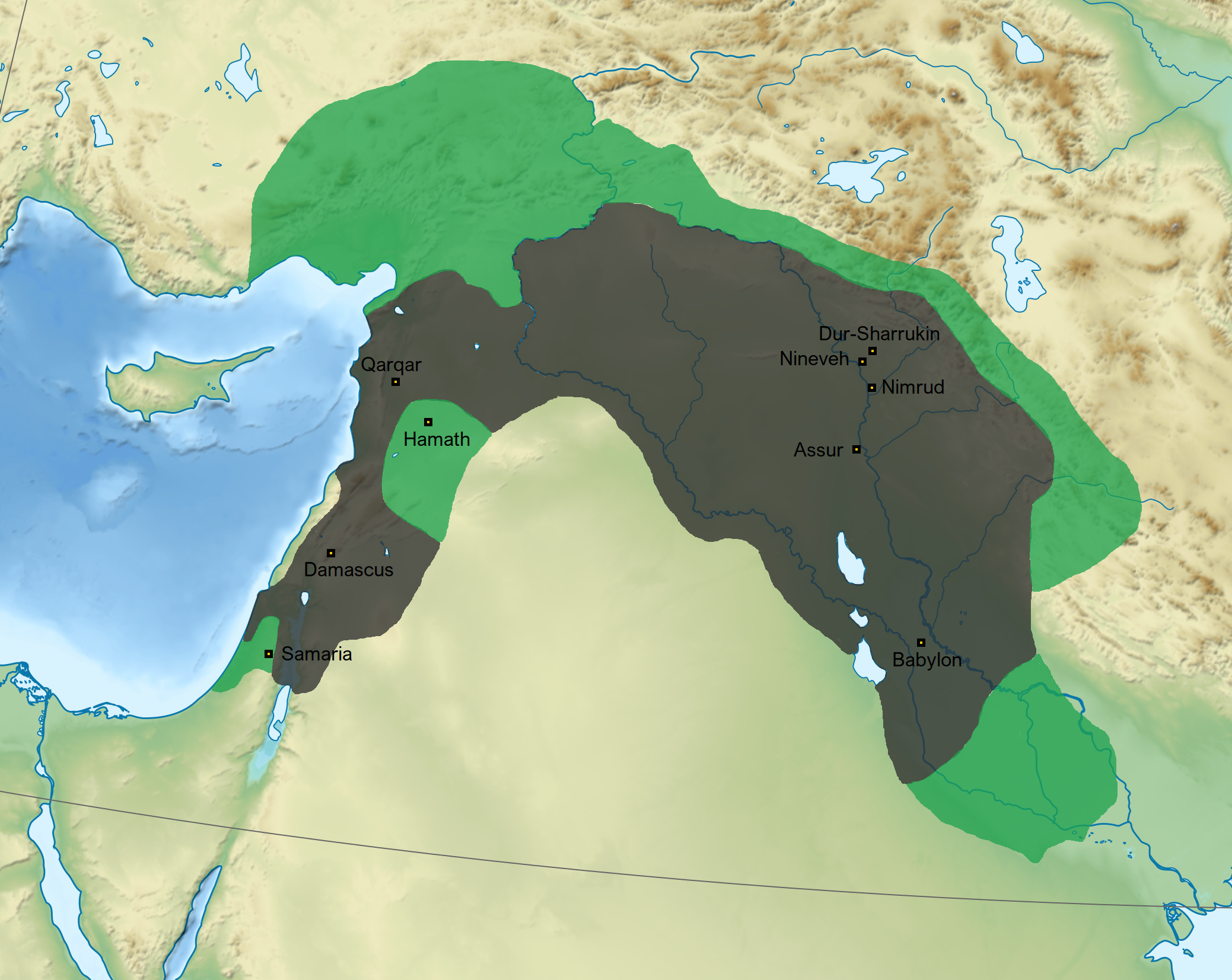
Map of the Neo-Assyrian Empire under Tiglath-Pileser III (dark) and after Sargon's conquests (dark and green)

After he took Babylon in 710, Sargon was proclaimed king of Babylon by the citizens of the city and spent the next three years in Babylon, in Marduk-apla-iddina's palace. Affairs in Assyria were in these years overseen by Sargon's son Sennacherib. Sargon participated in the annual Babylonian Akitu (New Years) festival and received homage and gifts from rulers of lands as far away from the heartland of his empire as Bahrain and Cyprus. Sargon engaged himself in various domestic affairs in Babylonia, digging a new canal from Borsippa to Babylon and defeating a people called the Hamaranaeans that had been plundering caravans near Sippar. In Sargon's inscriptions from this time, he used some traditionally Babylonian elements in his royal titles and frequently mentioned deities popular in Babylonia rather than those popular in Assyria. Some Assyrians, even members of the royal family, disagreed with Sargon's pro-Babylonian attitude. (Note: In texts written by Sargon's grandson Esarhaddon, Sargon is for instance criticized for being excessively lenient and indulgent in Babylonia.)

In Sargon's absence, developments in the rest of the empire were dealt with by his officials and generals. Midas of Phrygia remained a threat to Assyrian interests; to ensure that communication and trade remained open to Assyrian vassals in Anatolia, the Assyrians carefully monitored him. In 709, the Assyrian governor of Quwê, Ashur-sharru-usur personally resolved to end the Phrygian threat. His raids into Phrygia and the capture of a mountain fortress, perhaps Hilakku, frightened Midas, who willingly became Sargon's vassal.

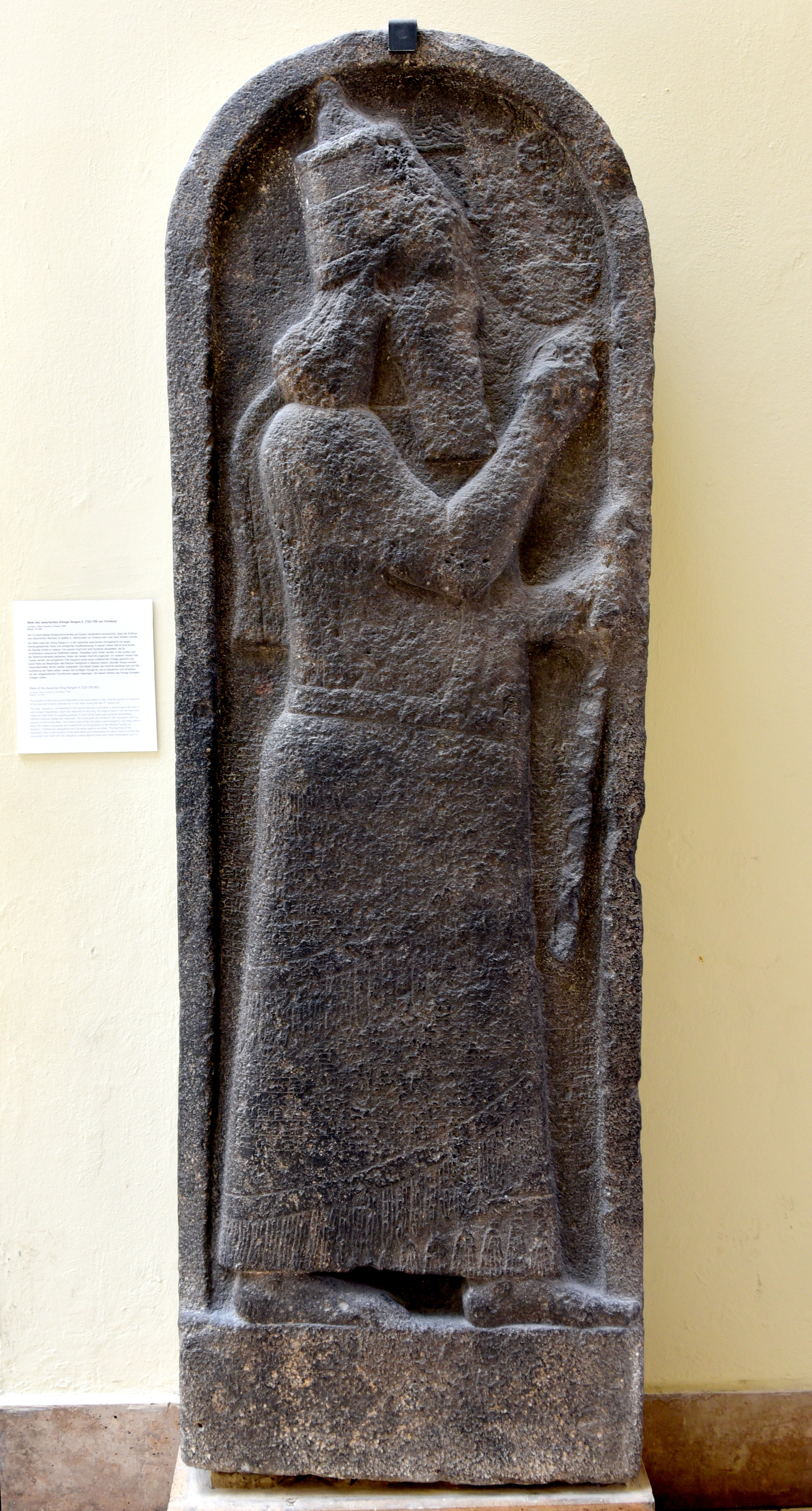
The Sargon Stele, erected in honor of Sargon at Kition on Cyprus some time after an Assyrian expedition in 709 BC.

In 709, Assyria sent an expedition to Cyprus. This was the first time that the Assyrians gained detailed knowledge of the island. Sargon did not personally participate in the campaign and the Assyrians relied on their Levantine vassals for transportation. Because Cyprus was far away, actually controlling the island would have been difficult, but the campaign resulted in several Cypriote rulers paying tribute to Sargon. After the departure of the expedition, the Cypriotes, probably with the aid of an Assyrian stonemason sent by the royal court, fashioned the Sargon Stele. The stele was an ideological marker indicating the boundary of the Assyrian king's sphere of influence and to mark the incorporation of Cyprus into the Assyrians' "known world". Since it had the king's image and words on it, it served as a representation of Sargon and a substitute for his presence.

In 709, one of Sargon's officers besieged the Phoenician city of Tyre after its leader refused to ally with Assyria. It proved to be one of the few military blunders of Sargon's time; the city resisted the Assyrians for several years until Sargon's death, after which the Assyrian army left. In 708, Mutallu of Kummuh withheld his tribute to Assyria for unknown reasons and allied with the new Urartian king Argishti II. Sargon sent one of his officers to capture Kummuh. The Assyrians heavily plundered Kummuh and annexed its lands. Mutallu survived, probably escaping to Urartu.

May the ruler, its builder, reach and attain the old age, and (abundant) posterity, may its founder live into the distant days (of the future) ... may he who dwells therein, make jubilation in health of body, joy of heart, well-being of soul; may he have abundance of luck.

— Excerpt from inscription by Sargon after the foundation of Dur-Sharrukin illustrating his hope to reside in the city for a long time.

Dur-Sharrukin was completed in 707 after a decade of construction. Sargon returned to Assyria to prepare the city's inauguration. A year later, he moved the royal court to Dur-Sharrukin. The inauguration began with Sargon "inviting the gods" to Dur-Sharrukin, placing statues of various gods in the city's temples. Sargon invited "princes of (all) countries, the governors of my land, scribes and superintendents, nobles, officials and elders of Assyria" to a great feast. The common people who had helped build the city were also invited to partake in the celebration, dining in the same hall as the king. Already shortly after its inauguration, the new capital was densely populated.

=== Final campaign and death ===
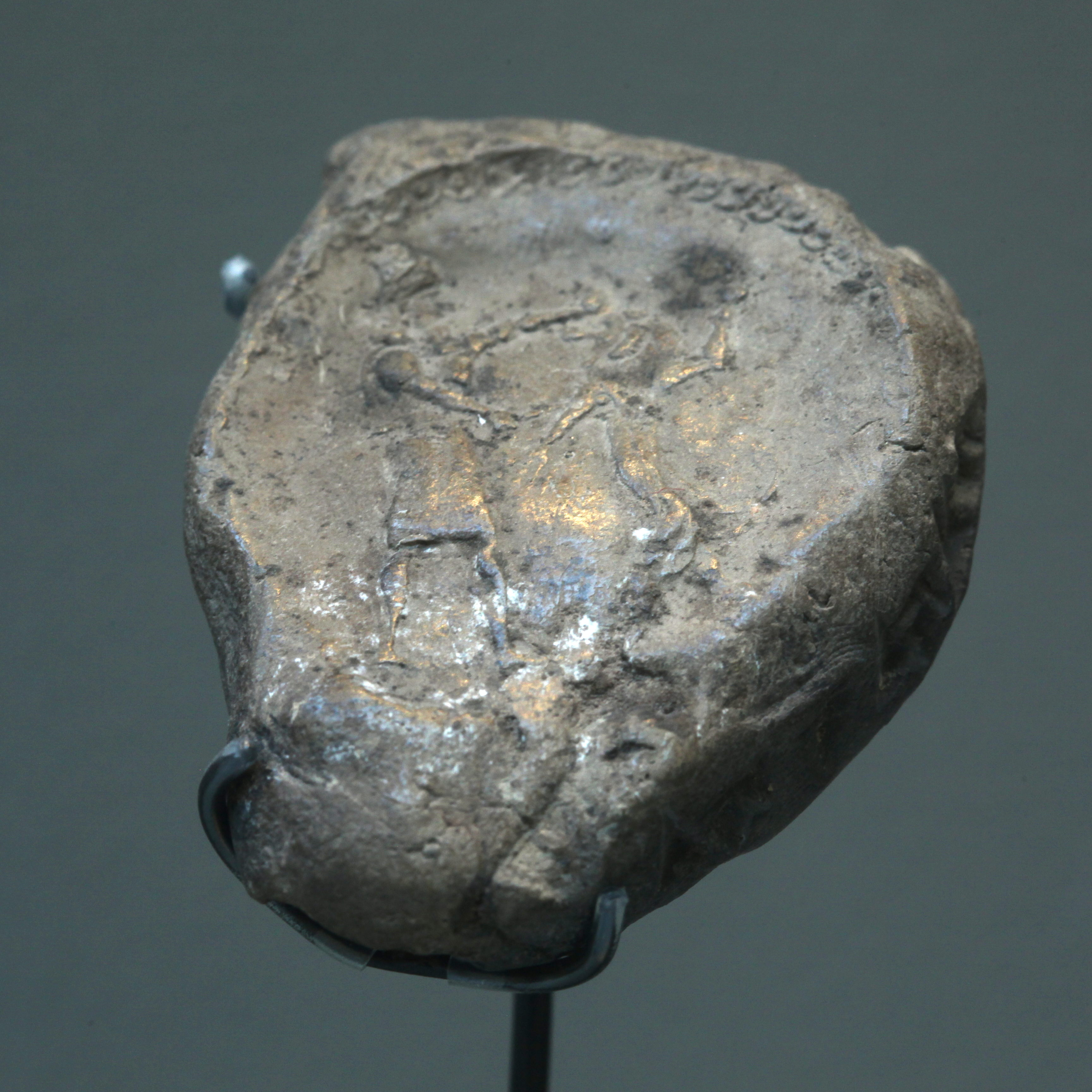
Impression of Sargon's royal seal, depicting the king killing a lion.

Few sources survive describing Sargon's final campaign and death. Based on the Assyrian Eponym List and the Babylonian Chronicles, the most likely course of events is that Sargon embarked to campaign against Tabal, which had risen up against him, in the early summer of 705. This campaign was the last of several attempts to bring Tabal under Assyrian control. It is not clear why Sargon resolved to lead the expedition against Tabal in person, considering the large number of campaigns led by his officials and generals. Tabal was not a real threat against the Assyrian Empire. Elayi believes that the most likely explanation is that Sargon saw the expedition as an interesting diversion from the quiet court life of Dur-Sharrukin.

Sargon's final campaign ended in disaster. Somewhere in Anatolia, Gurdî of Kulumma, an otherwise poorly attested figure, attacked the Assyrian camp. Gurdî has variously been assumed to have been a local ruler in Anatolia or a tribal leader of the Cimmerians, during this time allied with the rebels in Tabal. In the ensuing battle, Sargon was killed. The Assyrian soldiers fleeing from the attack were unable to recover the king's body. Sargon died just over a year after the inauguration of Dur-Sharrukin.

== Family and children ==
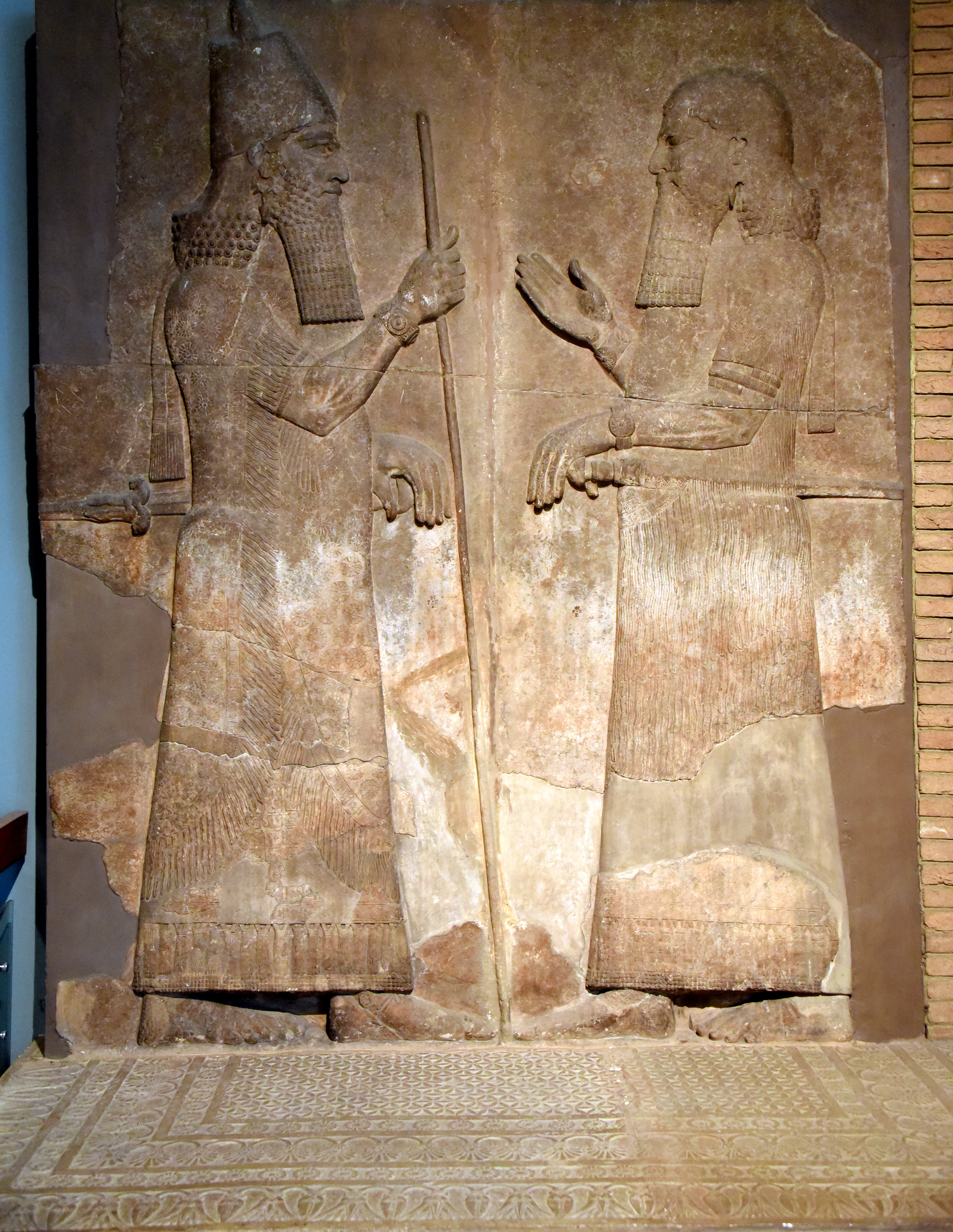
Relief from Dur-Sharrukin depicting Sargon (left) and his son Sennacherib (right), then the crown prince

In addition to Shalmaneser V probably being Sargon's brother, Sargon had a younger brother, Sin-ahu-usur (Sîn-aḫu-uṣur), who was by 714 the commander of Sargon's royal cavalry guard. After the inauguration of Dur-Sharrukin in 706, he was granted his own residence in the new capital. He appears to have held the influential position of grand vizier.

Two wives of Sargon are known: Ra'ima (Ra'īmâ) and Atalia (Ataliā). Atalia was Sargon's queen; her tomb was discovered in Nimrud in 1989. The general assumption among researchers is that Assyrian kings could have multiple wives, but only one woman at a time could be recognized as queen. Sennacherib was once believed to have been Atalia's son, but he is now known to have been the son of Ra'ima, since a stele from Assur, translated in 2014, explicitly refers to Ra'ima as his mother. There is no evidence that Ra'ima was ever Sargon's queen. Atalia is believed to have outlived Sargon and her remains found in 1989 indicate that she was aged approximately 30–35 at the time of death. Ra'ima must have been significantly older than Atalia given that she gave birth to Sennacherib c. 745. It is possible that Ra'ima also outlived Sargon since an inscription written by Sennacherib 692 BC references her, though it might have been written after her death.

Sargon had at least two sons before Sennacherib was born, though they died prior to Sennacherib's birth, indicated by Sennacherib's name, Sîn-aḫḫē-erība in Akkadian, meaning "[the god] Sîn has replaced the brothers". Like Sennacherib, the older sons were presumably sons of Ra'ima. Sennacherib, who succeeded Sargon as king (r. 705–681), was an adult at the time of Sargon's accession. He was named crown prince early in Sargon's reign and assisted his father in running the empire; he helped collect and summarize intelligence reports from the Assyrian spy network. Sargon had at least two children younger than Sennacherib, though their names are unknown. Their existence is indicated by a letter from Sargon's reign mentioning "Sennacherib, the crown prince ... [and all] the princes/children of the king (who are) [in] Assyria". Sargon's only known daughter was Ahat-Abisha (Aḫat-Abiša), who married Ambaris of Tabal. When Ambaris was dethroned by Sargon in 713, Ahat-Abisha probably returned to Assyria.

== Character ==
=== Warrior-king ===
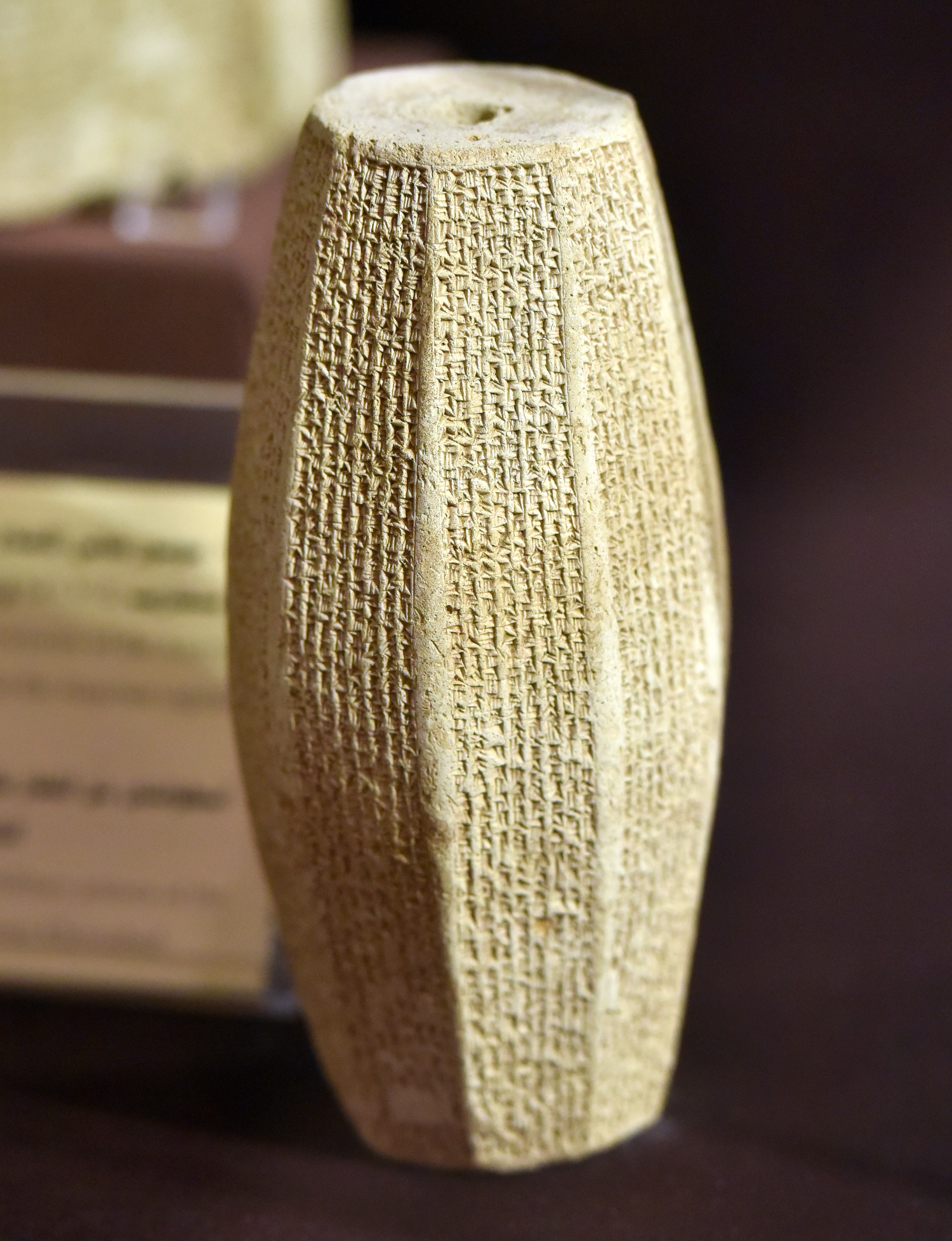
Terracotta cylinder from Dur-Sharrukin narrating Sargon's campaigns

Sargon II was a warrior-king and conqueror who commanded his armies in person and dreamt of conquering the world like Sargon of Akkad. Sargon assumed traditional Mesopotamian titles relating to world domination, such as "king of the universe" and "king of the four corners of the world", and great power, including "great king" and "mighty king". Although Neo-Assyrian kings' titles were formulaic, they typically used additional epithets to highlight their unique qualities and aspirations. Sargon's epithets present him as if he were an invincible warlord, for example, "mighty hero, clothed with terror, who sends forth his weapon to bring low the foe, brave warrior, since the day of whose (accession) to rulership, there has been no prince equal to him, who has been without conqueror or rival". Sargon wished to be seen as an omnipresent and eager warrior. Sargon is unlikely to have fought on the frontlines in all campaigns since this would greatly have jeopardized the empire, but it is clear that he was more interested in participating in war than his predecessors and successors and he did eventually die in battle.

Sargon was a highly successful military strategist who employed an extensive spy network, useful for administration and military activities, and employed well-trained scouts for reconnaissance when on campaign. Even though the Assyrian Empire was vastly more powerful than any of its enemies, these enemies also surrounded the empire. Because only one target could be attacked at a time, they had to be picked wisely in order to avoid disaster. Sargon outwitted his enemies on multiple occasions, for instance through the unexpected route he took in the war with Urartu. Sargon's ability to quickly react and adapt to setbacks distinguished him from his predecessors. Sargon also strengthened the Assyrian army; he was the first Assyrian king to appreciate the war potential of cavalry and made various innovations, including picking certain breeds of horses, developing new methods of harnessing and recruiting mercenary cavalry. Based on the contents of his letters, Sargon seems to have ensured discipline and obedience through fear rather than inspiration or adoration. When raising troops, he at times threatened them with the same type of punishments enacted against Assyria's worst enemies, should they disobey him.

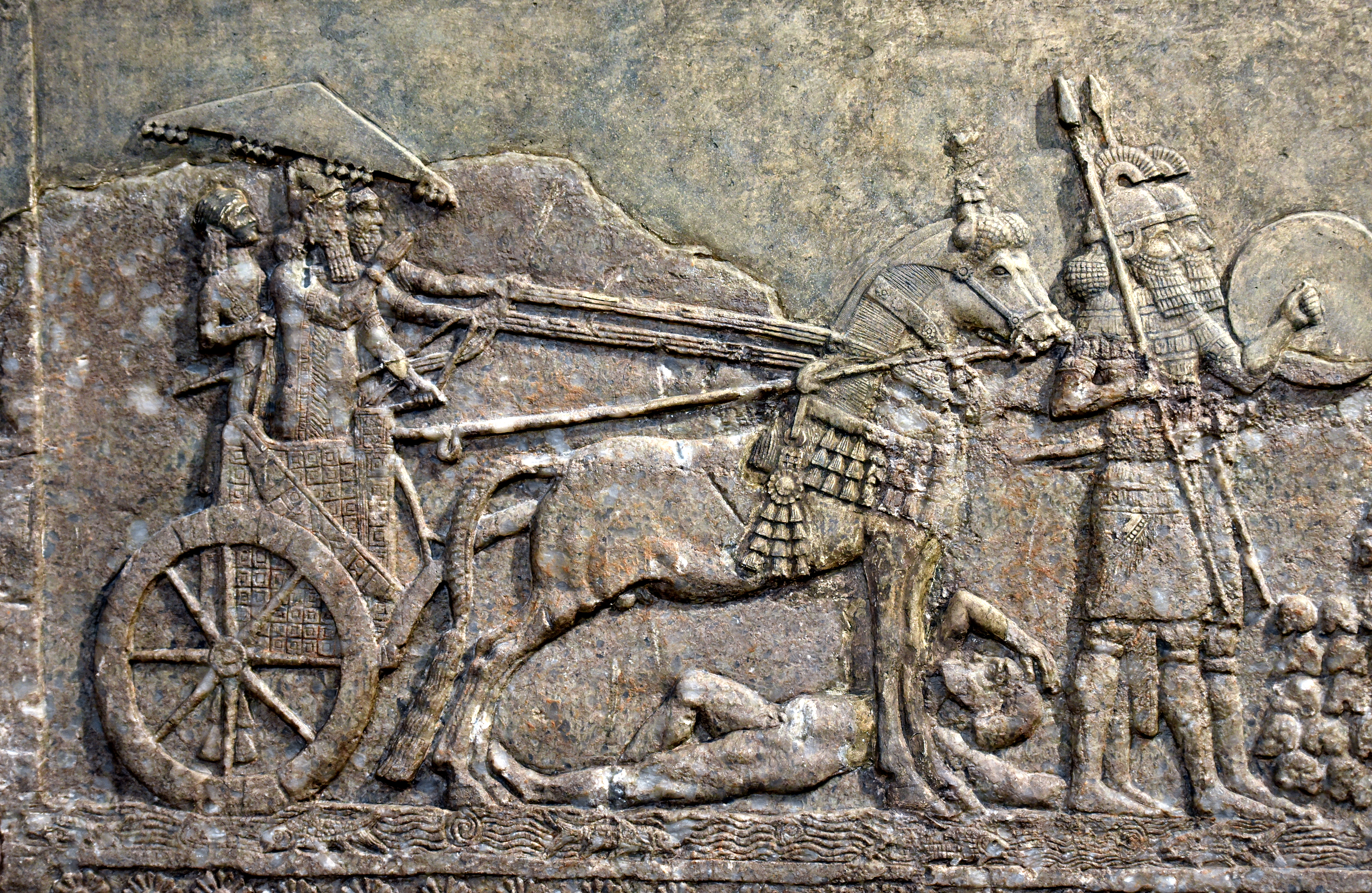
Relief from Dur-Sharrukin depicting Sargon in a chariot, observing an Assyrian attack on a city.

This is a royal order of great emergency! Assemble the commanders and the horsemen of your cavalry unit immediately! Whoever is late will be impaled in the middle of his own house, and his sons and daughters too will be slaughtered, which will then be the fault of his own! Don't delay! Drop everything and come straight away!

— Excerpt from a letter sent by Sargon II summoning a cavalry regiment to participate in a campaign

Unlike the numerous records of such punishments against Assyrian enemies, there is no evidence that Sargon's threats were realized—it is unlikely that they ever were. Because the soldiers in many cases had themselves participated in punishments against their enemies, the threats themselves were probably sufficient. Despite this approach, Sargon was not unpopular with the military; there are no records of army uprisings against him, nor of any army officers engaging in conspiracies. It is also probable that the main motivating factor for Assyrians serving in the army was not being threatened by the king, but rather the frequent spoils of war that could be taken after victories.

=== Quest for renown ===
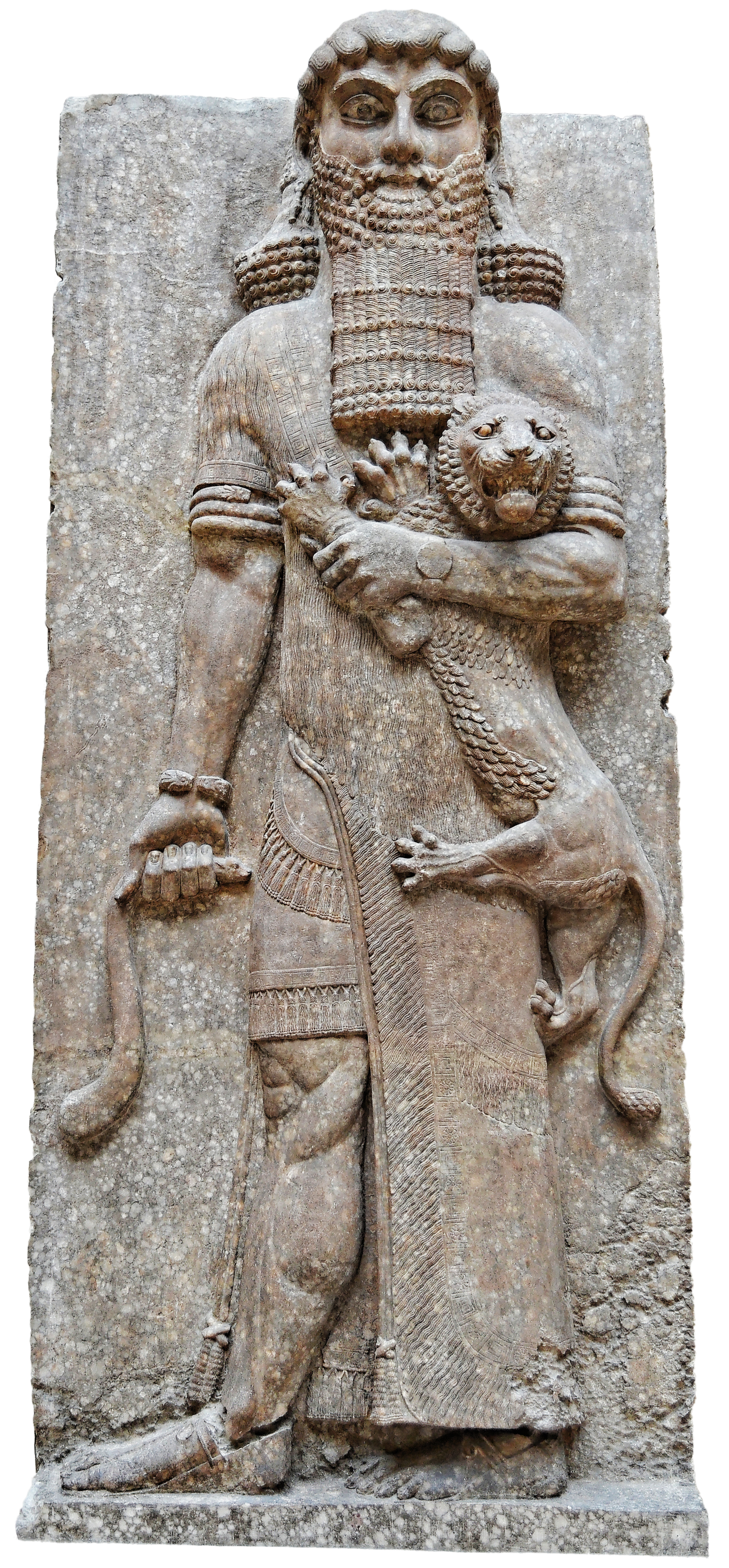
Giant relief from Dur-Sharrukin thought to depict Gilgamesh subduing a lion.

Nearly all Assyrian kings wished to outdo their predecessors and be remembered as glorious rulers. Sargon aspired to surpass all previous kings, even Sargon of Akkad. He established and cultivated his own cult of personality, for instance through having stelae made with depictions of him as a formidable king and placing these across the empire, often in highly visible places such as frequented passageways. In his palace in Dur-Sharrukin, Sargon decorated the walls with reliefs depicting himself and his achievements. He hoped that future generations would regard him as one of the greatest kings.

Sargon's aspiration for renown is also reflected in Dur-Sharrukin, which was likely founded mainly as an ideological statement given its location's lack of obvious merit. Perhaps inspired by Sargon of Akkad being credited as the founder of the city of Akkad, Sargon II built Dur-Sharrukin for his own glory and intended the city, and his various other building works, to preserve his memory for generations to come. The inscriptions in Dur-Sharrukin evoke Sargon's desire to initiate a golden age and to mark the beginning of a new world order. They also condemn those who would destroy Sargon's works and encourage future kings to honor his memory.

In addition to Sargon of Akkad, another figure idolized by Sargon II was the ancient Sumerian ruler Gilgamesh, chiefly known in Sargon's time through the Epic of Gilgamesh. In several surviving texts, Sargon II's feats were implicitly compared to the legend. In Sargon's inscriptions, the campaign against Urartu includes portions where it seems that Sargon is fighting not only the Urartians but also the landscape itself. A section where the mountains are described as if they are rising up as swords and spears to oppose Sargon's advance would probably have reminded Assyrian readers of a similar section in the Epic of Gilgamesh, implying that Sargon faced dangers equal to those of the ancient hero. A giant relief at Dur-Sharrukin depicts a muscular man holding a lion to his chest. Though the relief bears no inscription that proves its identity, scholars generally identify it as a depiction of Gilgamesh. In the Epic of Gilgamesh, Gilgamesh, though failing to gain actual immortality, achieves a type of immortality through his creation of an impressive wall surrounding Uruk, a building work that will outlast him and perpetuate his memory.

=== Guardian of justice ===
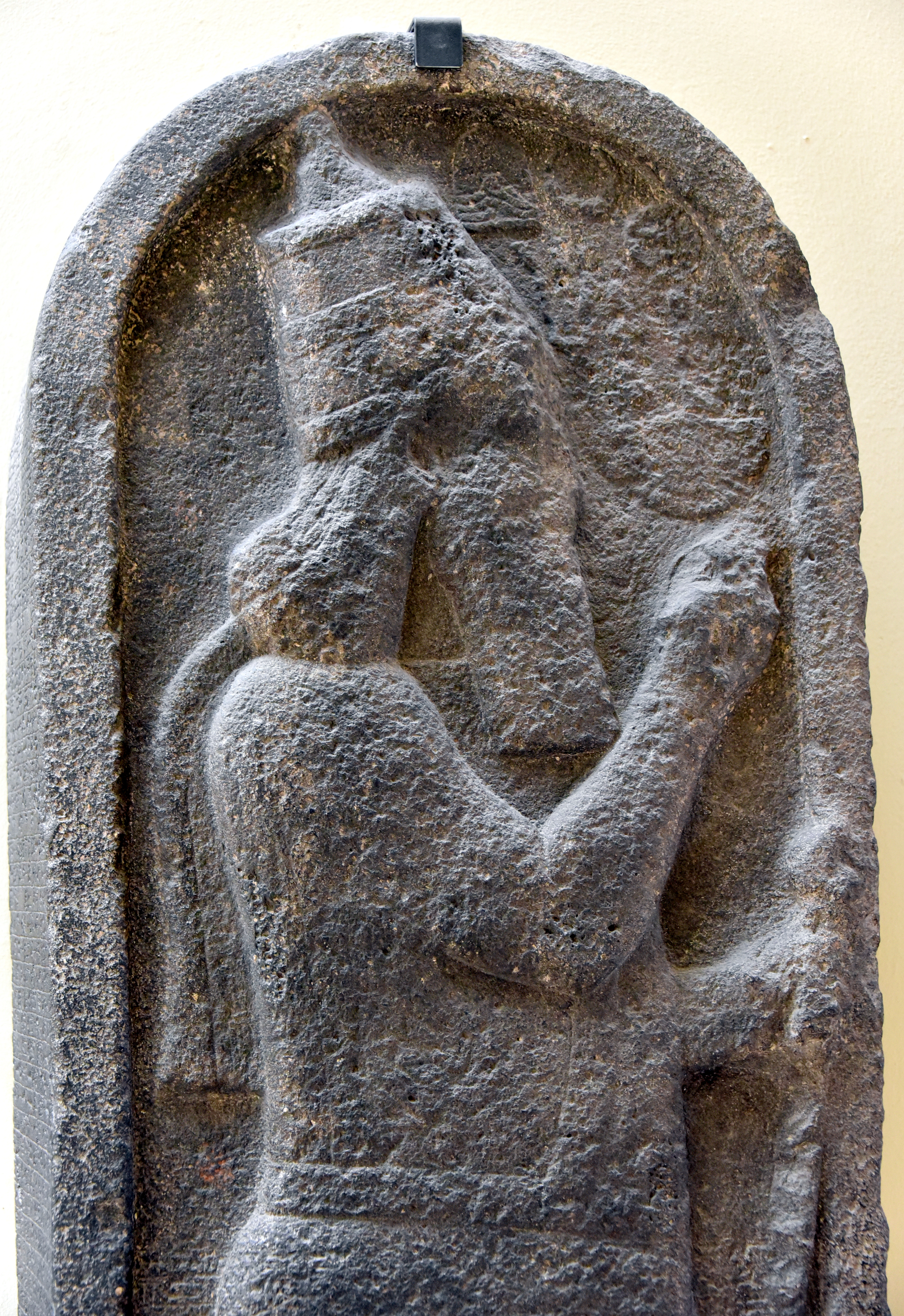
Close-up of the image of Sargon on the Sargon Stele from Cyprus.

Sargon titled himself a "guardian of justice" and considered himself to be divinely mandated to "maintain justice and right", "give guidance to those who are not strong" and "not to injure the weak". Sargon worked to ensure the protection and security of the people who lived under his rule.

Under Tiglath-Pileser III, Assyrian efforts to assimilate and incorporate conquered foreign peoples had begun in earnest. Sargon continued and extended this policy, putting foreigners on the same footing as the original Assyrian population. Sargon's accounts of conquests explicitly mention that he placed the same taxes on the people of the new territories as he did on the people in the Assyrian heartland. Sargon also encouraged assimilation, cultural mixture and the teaching, rather than forceful imposition, of Assyrian ways of life. One of the passages in an account of Dur-Sharrukin's construction for instance reads:

Subjects of (all) four (parts of the world), of foreign tongues, with different languages without similarity, people from mountainous regions and plains, so many (different people) as the light of the gods, (Note: Referring to the sun god Shamash.) lord above all, supervises, I let dwell inside [my new city] on the command of Ashur my lord [...]. Born Assyrians, experienced in all professions, I set above them as supervisors and guides to teach them how to work properly and respect the gods and the king.

The power and influence of the women at the royal court was increased in Sargon's reign. He created new military units subservient to the queen, which grew in size and diversity under Sargon's successors. These units were part of the military might of the empire and participated in campaigns. Sargon's motivation is not known, but perhaps he wanted to reduce the influence of powerful officials by delegating authority and responsibilities to trusted relatives, including women. The office of turtanu was split into two, one being assigned to the forces of the queen.

In Assyrian royal ideology, the Assyrian king was the divinely appointed mortal representative of Ashur. The king was seen as having the moral, humane and necessary obligation to extend Assyria since lands outside Assyria were regarded to be uncivilized and a threat to the cosmic and divine order within the Assyrian Empire. Expansionism was thus cast as a moral duty to convert chaos to civilization. Resistance against Assyrian rule was seen as fighting against divine will; rebels and enemies were criminals against the divine world order, deserving punishment. Though some atrocities are recorded in Sargon's inscriptions, including "filling the mountain valleys" with the bodies of enemy soldiers and gouging out the eyes of prisoners, Sargon's inscriptions do not appear to contain much overt sadism (unlike the inscriptions of some other kings, such as Ashurnasirpal II). Atrocities enacted by Assyrian kings were in most known cases directed only towards soldiers and elites; as of 2016 none of the known inscriptions or reliefs of Sargon mention or show harm being done to civilians. Unlike virtually all other Assyrian kings, Sargon did not solely exert dominion through aggression, but maintained good relations with several foreign ruling classes and external kings, rewarded loyal vassals, worked to seal alliances, and several times spared and forgave repentant enemies.

Sargon saw himself as exceptionally intelligent, more so than any of his predecessors. It is probable that he received the usual education of the Assyrian upper class, learning both Akkadian and Sumerian, as well as some arithmetic. Sargon was perhaps also educated in art or literature; he built a library in his palace and covered the palace walls in artwork. Sargon heavily promoted writing and scribal culture; court scholars became more prominent in Sargon's reign than both before and after. Over a thousand cuneiform letters are known from Sargon's time, more than from the reigns of his three successors combined.

== Legacy ==
=== Sargon forgotten ===
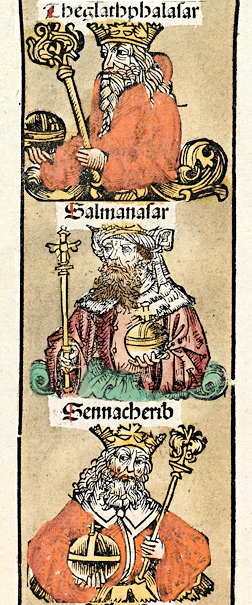
Section of the 1493 Nuremberg Chronicle depicting Assyrian kings. This portion shows Tiglath-Pileser III, Shalmaneser V and Sennacherib, omitting Sargon II.

Sargon's legacy in ancient Assyria was severely damaged by the manner of his death; in particular, the failure to recover his body was a major psychological blow for Assyria. The shock and theological implications plagued the reigns of his successors for decades. The ancient Assyrians believed that unburied dead became ghosts that could come back and haunt the living. Sargon was believed to be doomed to a miserable afterlife; his ghost would wander the Earth, eternally restless and hungry. Soon after the news of Sargon's death reached the Assyrian heartland, the influential advisor and scribe Nabu-zuqup-kena copied Tablet XII of the Epic of Gilgamesh. This tablet contains a section eerily similar to Sargon's death, with the miserable implications described in detail, (Note: Tablet XII contains a section wherein Gilgamesh and his associate Enkidu discuss the fates of a "man killed in battle" ("his father and mother hold up his head, his wife weeps for him"), a "man left unburied" ("his ghost has no rest in the underworld") and a "man who cannot be provided with funerary offerings" ("he heats scraps from the pot and breadcrumbs strewn in the streets").) which must have left the scribe stunned and distressed. In the Levant, Sargon's hubris was mocked. It is believed that a foreign ruler chided in the Biblical Book of Isaiah is based on Sargon.

Sennacherib was horrified by his father's death. The Assyriologist Eckart Frahm believes that Sennacherib was so deeply affected that he began suffering from posttraumatic stress disorder. Sennacherib was unable to acknowledge and mentally deal with what had transpired. Sargon's dishonorable death in battle and his lack of a burial was seen as a sign that he must have committed some serious and unforgivable sin that made the gods completely abandon him. Sennacherib concluded that Sargon had perhaps offended Babylon's gods by taking control of the city.

Sennacherib did everything he could to distance himself from Sargon and never wrote or built anything to honor Sargon's memory. One of his first building projects was restoring a temple dedicated to Nergal, god of the underworld, perhaps intended to pacify a deity possibly involved with Sargon's fate. Sennacherib also moved the capital to Nineveh, despite the fact that Dur-Sharrukin was entirely new and built to house the royal court. Given that Sargon modelled parts of his reign on Gilgamesh, Frahm believes that it is possible that Sennacherib abandoned Dur-Sharrukin on account of the Epic of Gilgamesh. The furious and hungry spirit of a mighty king might have been feared to mean that Sennacherib would be unable to hold court there. Sennacherib spent a lot of time and effort to rid the empire of Sargon's imagery and work. Images Sargon had created at the temple in Assur were made invisible through raising the level of the courtyard and Sargon's queen Atalia was buried hastily when she died, without regard to traditional burial practices and in the same coffin as another woman. Despite this, Sennacherib attempted to avenge his father, sending an expedition to Tabal in 704 to kill Gurdî and perhaps retrieve Sargon's body; whether it was successful is not known.

After Sennacherib's reign, Sargon was sometimes mentioned as the ancestor of later kings. (Note: He is mentioned as such in the inscriptions of his grandson Esarhaddon (r. 681–669 BC), his great-grandson Shamash-shum-ukin (r. 668–648 BC in Babylonia) and his great-great-grandson Sinsharishkun (r. 627–612 BC).) Assyria fell in the late 7th century BC. Though the local population of northern Mesopotamia never forgot ancient Assyria, knowledge of Assyria in Western Europe throughout the centuries thereafter derived from the writings of classical authors and the Bible. Due to the efforts of Sennacherib, Sargon was poorly remembered by the time these works were written. Sargon was obscure in Assyriology prior to the rediscovery of Dur-Sharrukin in the 19th century. His name appears once in the Bible (Isaiah 20.1). Many Assyriological commentators were puzzled by the name's appearance in the Bible and believed that Sargon was merely an alias for one of the better-known kings, typically Shalmaneser, Sennacherib or Esarhaddon.

=== Sargon rediscovered ===
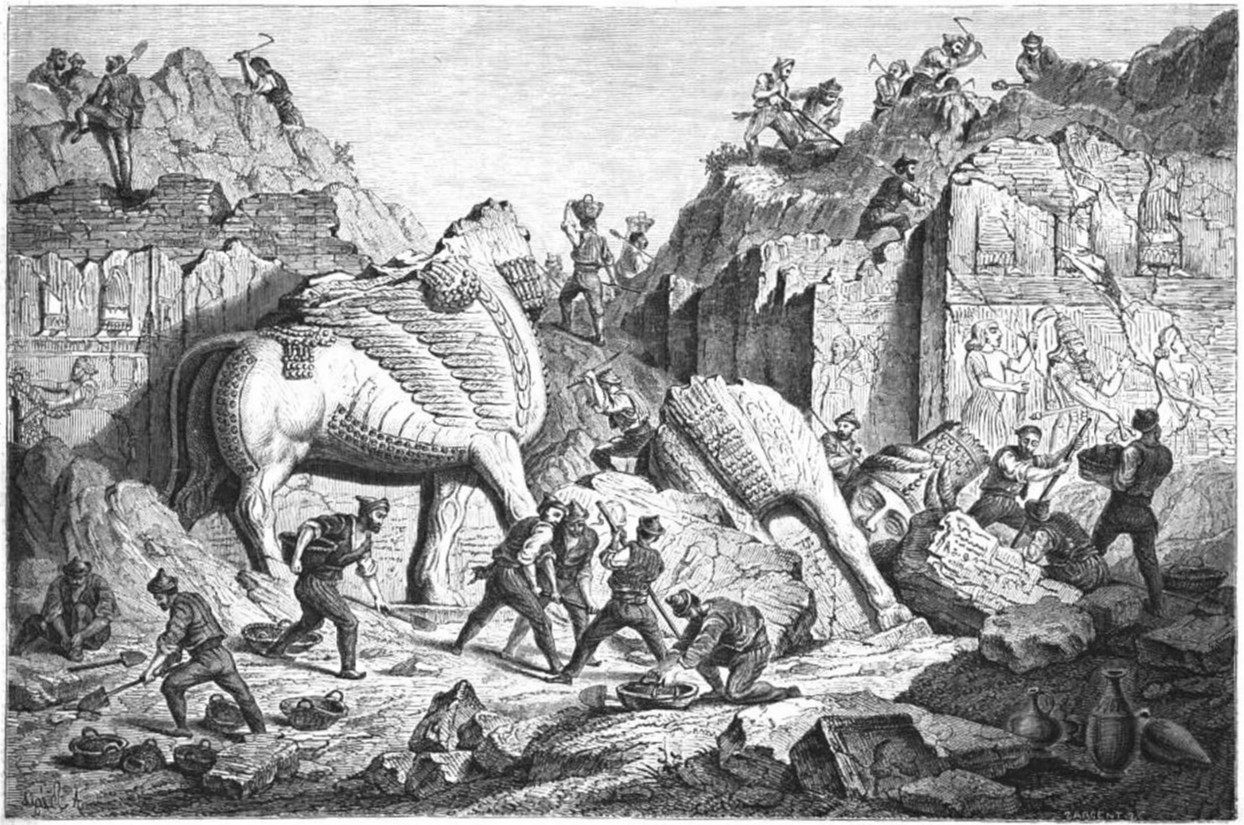
1861 illustration by Eugène Flandin of excavations of the ruins of Dur-Sharrukin

European explorers and archaeologists first began excavations in northern Mesopotamia in the early 19th century. Around this time some scholars placed Sargon as a distinct king between Shalmaneser and Sennacherib. Dur-Sharrukin was found by chance; Paul-Émile Botta was conducting excavations at Nineveh when he heard about it from locals in 1843. Under Botta and his assistant Victor Place, virtually the entire palace was excavated, as were portions of the surrounding town. In 1847, the first-ever exhibition on Assyrian sculptures was held in the Louvre, composed of finds from Sargon's palace. Botta's report on his findings, published in 1849, garnered exceptional interest. Though much of what was excavated at Dur-Sharrukin was left in situ, reliefs and other artifacts have been exhibited across the world, including the Louvre, the Oriental Institute of the University of Chicago and the Iraq Museum.

In 1845, Isidore Löwenstern was the first to suggest that Sargon was the builder of Dur-Sharrukin, although he based this identification on erroneous readings of cuneiform. After cuneiform was deciphered, archaeologist Adrien Prévost de Longpérier confirmed the king's name to be Sargon in 1847. Discussions and debate continued for several years and Sargon was not fully accepted by Assyriologists as a distinct king until the 1860s. Through the large number of sources left behind from his time, Sargon is better known than many of his predecessors and successors, and than the ancient Sargon of Akkad. Modern Assyriologists consider Sargon to have been one of the most important Assyrian kings given the substantial expansion of Assyrian territory undertaken in his reign and his political and military reforms. Sargon left a stable and strong empire, though it proved difficult to control by his successors. Sennacherib had to face several revolts against his rule, some of them motivated by the manner of Sargon's death, though they were all eventually defeated. Elayi assessed Sargon in 2017 as "the real founder of the empire" and a man who "succeeded in everything in his life, but completely failed in his death". Since the early 20th century, Sargon has also been a common name among modern Assyrian people.

== Titles ==
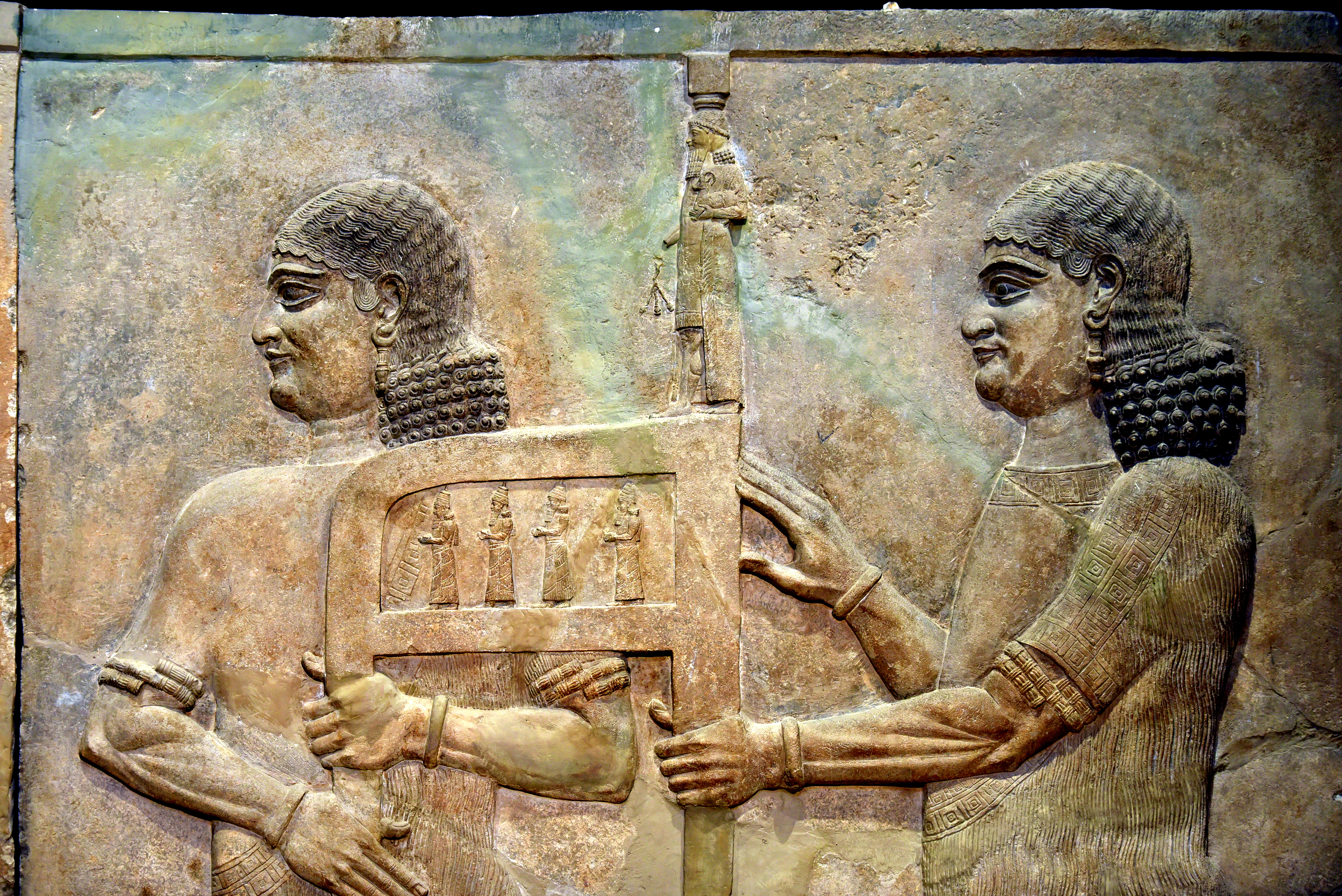
Relief from Dur-Sharrukin depicting eunuchs carrying Sargon's throne.

The Sargon Stele from Cyprus gives Sargon the following titles:

Sargon, the great king, the mighty king, king of the universe, king of Assyria, viceroy of Babylon, king of Sumer and Akkad, king of the four corners of the world, favorite of the great gods, who go before me; Ashur, Nabu and Marduk have intrusted to me an unrivaled kingdom and have caused my gracious name to attain unto highest renown.

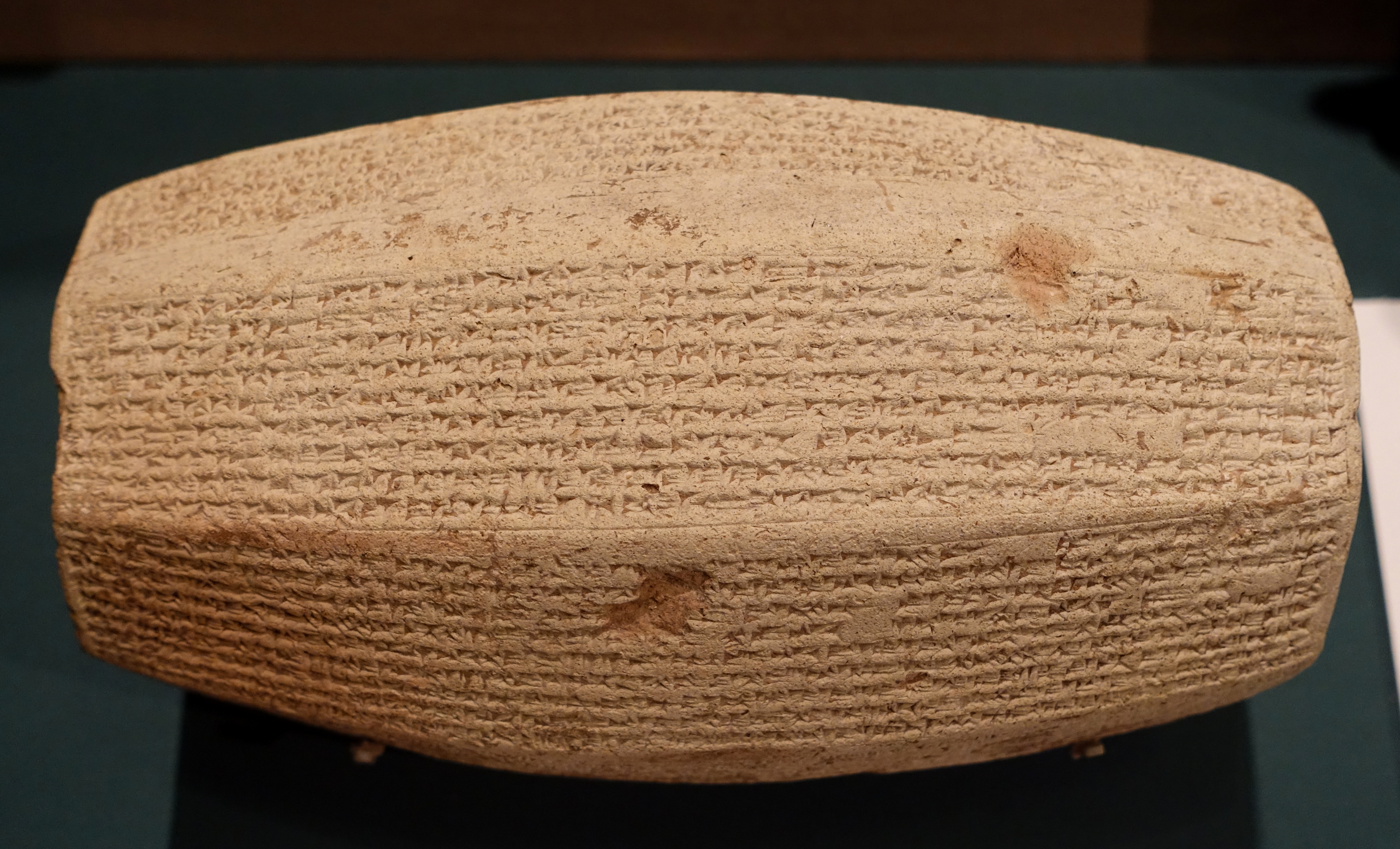
Prism commemorating Sargon's founding of Dur-Sharrukin.

In an account of restoration work done to Ashurnasirpal II's palace in Nimrud (written before Sargon's reconquest of Babylonia), Sargon used the following longer titulature:

Sargon, prefect of Enlil, priest of Ashur, elect of Anu and Enlil, the mighty king, king of the universe, king of Assyria, king of the four corners of the world, favorite of the great gods, rightful ruler, whom Ashur and Marduk have called, and whose name they have caused to attain unto the highest renown; mighty hero, clothed with terror, who sends forth his weapon to bring low the foe; brave warrior, since the day of whose accession to rulership, there has been no prince equal to him, who has been without conqueror or rival; who has brought under his sway all lands from the rising to the setting sun and has assumed the rulership of the subjects of Enlil; warlike leader, to whom Nudimmud has granted the greatest might, whose hand has drawn a sword which cannot be withstood; exalted prince, who came face to face with Humban-nikash, king of Elam, in the outskirts of Der and defeated him; subduer of the land of Judah, which lies far away; who carried off the people of Hama, whose hands captured Yahu-Bihdi, their king; who repulsed the people of Kakmê, wicked enemies; who set in order the disordered Mannean tribes; who gladdened the heart of his land; who extended the border of Assyria; painstaking ruler; snare of the faithless; whose hand captured Pisiri, king of Hatti, and set his official over Carchemish, his capital; who carried off the people of Shinuhtu, belonging to Kiakki, king of Tabal, and brought them to Assur, his capital; who placed his yoke on the land of Muski; who conquered the Manneans, Karallu and Paddiri; who avenged his land; who overthrew the distant Medes as far as the rising sun.

== See also ==
- List of Assyrian kings
- Military history of the Neo-Assyrian Empire
- Sargon II's Prisms
- Annals of Sargon II

== Sources ==
- Akopian, Arman (2017). Introduction to Aramean and Syriac Studies. Piscataway: Gorgias Press. ISBN 978-1-4632-0738-0.
- Bagg, Ariel (2016). "Where is the Public? A New Look at the Brutality Scenes in Neo-Assyrian Royal Inscriptions and Art". In Battini, Laura (ed.). Making Pictures of War: Realia et Imaginaria in the Iconology of the Ancient Near East. Archaeopress Ancient Near Eastern Archaeology. Oxford: Archaeopress. doi:10.2307/j.ctvxrq18w.12. ISBN 978-1-78491-403-5.
- Bauer, Susan Wise (2007). The History of the Ancient World: From the Earliest Accounts to the Fall of Rome. New York: W. W. Norton & Company. ISBN 978-0-393-05974-8.
- Bedford, Peter R. (2009). "The Neo-Assyrian Empire". In Morris, Ian; Scheidel, Walter (eds.). The Dynamics of Ancient Empires: State Power from Assyria to Byzantium. Oxford: Oxford University Press. ISBN 978-0-19-537158-1.
- Brinkman, John Anthony (1973). "Sennacherib's Babylonian Problem: An Interpretation". Journal of Cuneiform Studies. 25 (2): 89–95. doi:10.2307/1359421. JSTOR 1359421. S2CID 163623620.
- Chen, Fei (2020). "A List of Assyrian Kings". Study on the Synchronistic King List from Ashur. BRILL. ISBN 978-90-04-43091-4.
- Cogan, Mordechai (2017). "Restoring the Empire". Israel Exploration Journal. 67 (2): 151–167. JSTOR 26740626.
- Dalley, Stephanie (2017). "Assyrian Warfare". In E. Frahm (ed.). A Companion to Assyria. Hoboken: John Wiley & Sons. ISBN 978-1-444-33593-4.
- Damerji, Muayyad Said (2008). An Introduction to the Nimrud Tombs. Nimrud Conference. Vol. New Light on Nimrud: Proceedings of the Nimrud Conference 11th–13th March 2002. pp. 81–82. ISBN 978-0-903472-24-1.
- Darling, Linda T. (2013). A History of Social Justice and Political Power in the Middle East: The Circle of Justice From Mesopotamia to Globalization. London: Routledge. ISBN 978-0-415-50361-7.
- Dubovský, Peter (2006). "Tiglath-pileser III's Campaigns in 734-732 B.C.: Historical Background of Isa 7; 2 Kgs 15-16 and 2 Chr 27-28". Biblica. 87 (2): 153–170. JSTOR 42614666.
- Dubovský, Peter (2006). Hezekiah and the Assyrian Spies: Reconstruction of the Neo-Assyrian Intelligence Services and Its Significance for 2 Kings 18-19. Rome: Gregorian & Biblical Press. ISBN 978-88-7653-352-5.
- Düring, Bleda S. (2020). The Imperialisation of Assyria: An Archaeological Approach. Cambridge: Cambridge University Press. ISBN 978-1-108-47874-8.
- Elayi, Josette (2017). Sargon II, King of Assyria. Atlanta: Society of Biblical Literature Press. ISBN 978-1-62837-177-2.
- Elayi, Josette (2018). Sennacherib, King of Assyria. Atlanta: Society of Biblical Literature Press. ISBN 978-0-88414-317-8.
- Fales, Frederick Mario (2014). "The Two Dynasties of Assyria". In Gaspa, Salvatore; Greco, Alessandro; Morandi Bonacossi, Daniele; Ponchia, Simonetta & Rollinger, Robert (eds.). From Source to History: Studies on Ancient Near Eastern Worlds and Beyond. Münster: Ugarit Verlag. ISBN 978-3-86835-101-9.
- Foster, Benjamin R. (2016). The Age of Agade: Inventing Empire in Ancient Mesopotamia. New York: Routledge. ISBN 978-1-138-90971-7.
- Frahm, Eckart (2014). "Family Matters: Psychohistorical Reflections on Sennacherib and His Times". In Kalimi, Isaac; Richardson, Seth (eds.). Sennacherib at the Gates of Jerusalem: Story, History and Historiography. Leiden: Brill Publishers. ISBN 978-90-04-26561-5.
- Frahm, Eckart (2017). "The Neo-Assyrian Period (ca. 1000–609 BCE)". In E. Frahm (ed.). A Companion to Assyria. Hoboken: John Wiley & Sons. ISBN 978-1-444-33593-4.
- Frame, Grant (2021). The Royal Inscriptions of Sargon II, King of Assyria (721–705 BC). Vol. 2. University Park: Eisenbrauns. doi:10.5325/j.ctv1g8092k. ISBN 978-1-64602-109-3. JSTOR 10.5325/j.ctv1g8092k.
- Garelli, Paul (1991). "The Achievement of Tiglath-pileser III: Novelty or Continuity?". In Cogan, M.; Eph'al, I. (eds.). Studies in Assyrian History and Ancient Near Eastern Historiography Presented to Hayim Tadmor. Jerusalem: Magnes. OCLC 23965475.
- Helle, Sophus (2021). Gilgamesh: A New Translation of the Ancient Epic. London: Yale University Press. ISBN 978-0-300-25118-0.
- Holloway, Steven W. (2003). "The Quest for Sargon, Pul and Tiglath-Pileser in the Nineteenth Century". In Chavalas, Mark W.; Younger, K. Lawson Jr. (eds.). Mesopotamia and the Bible. Edinburgh: A&C Black. ISBN 978-1-84127-252-8.
- Hurowitz, Victor Avigdor (2010). "Name Midrashim and Word Plays on Names in Akkadian Historical Writings". In Horowitz, Wayne; Gabbay, Uri; Vukosavovic, Filip (eds.). A Woman of Valor: Jerusalem Ancient Near Eastern Studies in Honor of Joan Goodnick Westenholz. Madrid: CSIC Press. ISBN 978-84-00-09182-8.
- Jakubiak, Krzysztof (2004). "Some remarks on Sargon II's eighth campaign of 714 BC". Iranica Antiqua. 39: 191–202. doi:10.2143/IA.39.0.503895.
- Karlsson, Mattias (2017). "Assyrian Royal Titulary in Babylonia" (PDF). S2CID 6128352.
- Kertai, David (2013). "The Queens of the Neo-Assyrian Empire". Altorientalische Forschungen. 40 (1): 108–124. doi:10.1524/aof.2013.0006. S2CID 163392326.
- Kovacs, Maureen Gallery (1989). The Epic of Gilgamesh. Stanford: Stanford University Press. ISBN 0-8047-1589-0.
- Livingstone, Alasdair (2017). "Assyrian Literature". In E. Frahm (ed.). A Companion to Assyria. Hoboken: John Wiley & Sons. ISBN 978-1-444-33593-4.
- Luckenbill, Daniel David (1927). Ancient Records of Assyria and Babylonia Volume 2: Historical Records of Assyria From Sargon to the End. Chicago: University of Chicago Press. OCLC 179907647.
- Melville, Sarah C. (2016). The Campaigns of Sargon II, King of Assyria, 721–705 B.C. Norman: University of Oklahoma Press. ISBN 978-0-8061-5403-9.
- Melville, Sarah C. (2019). "Neo-Assyrian Women Revisited". Journal of the American Oriental Society. 139 (3): 687–692. doi:10.7817/jameroriesoci.139.3.0687. JSTOR 10.7817/jameroriesoci.139.3.0687. S2CID 211660781.
- Novák, Mirko (2016). "Assyrians and Arameans: Modes of Cohabitation and Acculuration at Guzana (Tell Halaf)". In Aruz, Joan; Seymour, Michael (eds.). Assyria to Iberia: Art and Culture in the Iron Age. New York: Metropolitan Museum of Art. ISBN 978-1-58839-606-8.
- Parker, Bradley J. (2011). "The Construction and Performance of Kingship in the Neo-Assyrian Empire". Journal of Anthropological Research. 67 (3): 357–386. doi:10.3998/jar.0521004.0067.303. JSTOR 41303323. S2CID 145597598.
- Radner, Karen (2010). "The stele of Sargon II of Assyria at Kition: A focus for an emerging Cypriot identity?". In Rollinger, Robert; Gufler, Birgit; Lang, Martin; Madreiter, Irene (eds.). Interkulturalität in der Alten Welt: Vorderasien, Hellas, Ägypten und die vielfältigen Ebenen des Kontakts. Leipzig: Harrassowitz Verlag. ISBN 978-3-447-06171-1.
- Radner, Karen (2017). "Economy, Society, and Daily Life in the Neo-Assyrian Period". In E. Frahm (ed.). A Companion to Assyria. Hoboken: John Wiley & Sons. ISBN 978-1-444-33593-4.
- Reade, Julian (2011). "The Evolution of Assyrian Imperial Architecture: Political Implications and Uncertainties". Mesopotamia. XLVI: 109–125. ISSN 0076-6615.
- Svärd, Saana (2015). "Changes in Neo-Assyrian Queenship". State Archives of Assyria Bulletin. XXI: 157–171. ISSN 1120-4699.
- Svärd, Saana (2016). "Neo-Assyrian elite women". In Budin, Stephanie Lynn & MacIntosh Turfa, Jean (eds.). Women in Antiquity: Real women across the Ancient World. Oxford: Routledge. ISBN 978-1-138-80836-2.
- Trolle Larsen, Mogens (2017). "The Archaeological Exploration of Assyria". In E. Frahm (ed.). A Companion to Assyria. Hoboken: John Wiley & Sons. ISBN 978-1-444-33593-4.
- Van Der Spek, Robartus (1977). "The struggle of king Sargon II of Assyria against the Chaldaean Merodach-Baladan (710-707 B.C.)". JEOL. 25: 56–66.
- Wilson, Ian D. (2017). Kingship and Memory in Ancient Judah. Oxford: Oxford University Press. ISBN 978-0-19-049990-7.
- Yamada, Keiko & Yamada, Shiego (2017). "Shalmaneser V and His Era, Revisited". In Baruchi-Unna, Amitai; Forti, Tova; Aḥituv, Shmuel; Ephʿal, Israel & Tigay, Jeffrey H. (eds.). "Now It Happened in Those Days": Studies in Biblical, Assyrian, and Other Ancient Near Eastern Historiography Presented to Mordechai Cogan on His 75th Birthday. Vol. 2. Winona Lake, Indiana: Eisenbrauns. ISBN 978-1-57506-760-5.

Sargon II Sargonid dynasty Born: c. 770–760 BC Died: 705 BC
Preceded by Shalmaneser V	King of Assyria; 722 – 705 BC	Succeeded by Sennacherib
Preceded by Marduk-apla-iddina II	King of Babylon; 710 – 705 BC	Succeeded by Sennacherib
