= Dur-Athara =

Ancient city in Southern Babylonia

Dur-Athara or Dur-Atkhara, more properly known as Dur-abi-hara, was an ancient city in Southern Babylonia. Babylonian king Marduk-apla-iddina II (died 702) fortified the city as part of his war against Sargon II (722-705), moving "the entire Gambulu tribe" (an Aramean people) into it. He dug a canal from the nearby Surappu river, causing the entire area to flood, leaving the city in the position of an "artificial island". Sargon's attack of Dur-Athara came in 710, and according to Assyrian annals was completed in a single day. Sargon plundered the city and deported 18,400 people from it, after which Gambulu leaders offered tribute. Sargon gave the city a new name, Dur-Nabu, and made it the capital of the province of Gambulu.
