= Gambulu =

The Gambulu, Gambulai, or Gambuli were a tribe of Arameans in ancient Babylonia.

== History ==
They were the most powerful tribe along the eastern border of Babylonia, or in the south toward the border with Elam. It is difficult to pinpoint their exact location. H. W. F. Saggs places them "south of the Diyala river toward the Elamite border." According to Ashurbanipal, the capital of the Gambulians was named Shapi-Bel, presumably located in the marshlands of southern Babylonia, near Elam. When Assyrian king Sargon II (722-705 BC) waged war against them in the city of Dur-Athara, 18,430 Gambulians were deported.

Beginning in 665 BC, Ashurbanipal faced multiple revolts from the Gambulians throughout his reign. The first was when Bel-iqisha, chieftain of the Gambulians, rebelled against Ashurbanipal after he had been implicated as supporting the Elamite invasion of Assyria and was forced to relinquish some of his authority. Little is known of this revolt, but there is a letter preserved in which Ashurbanipal orders the governor of Uruk, Nabu-usabsi, to attack Bel-iqisha. Nabu-usabsi apparently claimed that Bel-iqisha was solely to blame for the Elamite invasion.

After Bel-iqisha's death in 663 BC, his son, Dunanu, submitted to Ashurbanial but later supported Teumman in Elam's revolt against Assyria. Dunanu, who had supported the Elamites at the Battle of the Ulai River, was captured alongside his family and executed. The Gambulians were attacked by Ashurbanipal's army and brutally punished, with Shapi-Bel being flooded and many of its inhabitants slaughtered. In Dananu's stead, Ashurbanipal appointed a noble called Rimutu as the new Gambulian chieftain after he had agreed to pay a considerable sum in tribute to the Assyrian king. The Gambulu, along with the Puqudu, continued to be politically important as far as the sixth century BC.

== Sources ==
- Ahmed, Sami Said (2018). Southern Mesopotamia in the time of Ashurbanipal. The Hague: Walter de Gruyter GmbH & Co KG. ISBN 978-3111033587.
