= Yahu-Bihdi =

Hittite king of Syria (c. 720 BCE)

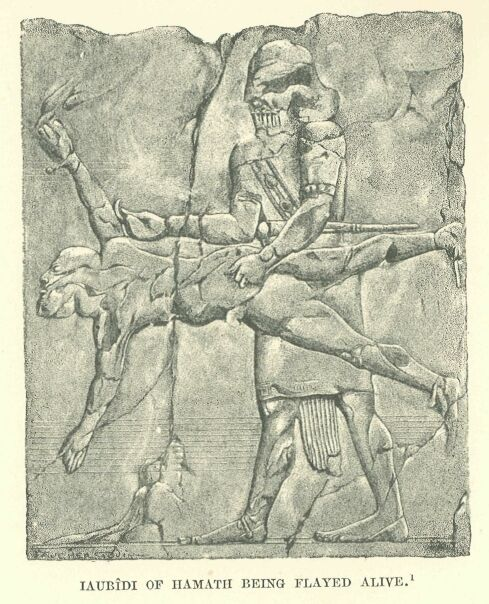
Yahu-Bihdi being flayed alive, from an Assyrian engraving.

Yahu-Bihdi (Akkadian: 𒅀𒌑𒁉𒀪𒁲 ia-ú-bi-ʾ-di, "Yahu created me"), also spelled Yahubidi and additionally recorded as Ilu-Bihdi (Akkadian: 𒀭𒁉𒀪𒁲 ìl-bi-ʾ-di, "El created me") was a governor of Hamath appointed by the Assyrian government. He declared himself king of Hamath in 720 BC and led a revolt which was promptly suppressed. Yahu-Bihdi himself was flayed alive. His revolt occurred roughly shortly after the conquest of the Kingdom of Israel by Sargon II and roughly simultaneously with revolts in Babylon as well as in Arpad, Damascus and elsewhere in the Levant.

His name, with the component Yahu (coupled with the fact that 'Ilu' was considered an appropriate substitutive element), suggests that he may have been an Israelite — though Sargon called him a Hittite — or a worshipper of Yahweh. Following his defeat, many residents of Hamath were deported to Samerina by the Assyrians, where they became one of the component groups of the Samaritan people. Hamath itself was destroyed after the siege, but had been rebuilt by the 400s BC.
