= Saana Svärd =

Finnish assyriologist

Saana Sofia Svärd (born 4 August 1977 in Enontekiö) is a Finnish Assyriologist, serving since 2018 as Associate Professor of Ancient Near Eastern Studies in the Faculty of Arts and the University of Helsinki. She is known as an expert on the cultural history of the ancient Near East, most notably the Neo-Assyrian Empire, social and political power relations, and ancient concepts of gender, but also in the field of language technology and digital humanities. Most recently, in 2017, she edited together with Charles Halton the anthology Women's Writing of Ancient Mesopotamia: An Anthology of the Earliest Female Authors for the Cambridge University Press.

== Biography ==
Svärd received her Ph.D. from the University of Helsinki in 2012 and is a docent of Assyriology in that same university and a docent in Cultural History of the Near East at the University of Turku. She has held visiting research positions at the University of California, Berkeley, the University of Tartu, the University of Innsbruck, Chuo University (Tokyo) and the University of Malta. She is a member of the Centre of Excellence in Changes in Sacred Texts and Traditions (director: Martti Nissinen), and a member of the Academy Project Semantic Domains in Akkadian Texts (director: Krister Lindén).

Since 2018, Svärd is the director of the Academy of Finland Centre of Excellence in Ancient Near Eastern Empires, an interdisciplinary research centre at the University of Helsinki that focuses on how changing imperial dynamics through the periods of Neo-Assyrian, Neo-Babylonian, Persian, Hellenistic, and early Roman/Parthian control impact social group identities and lifeways during the first millennium BCE.

== Books ==
- Power and women in Neo-Assyrian palaces. State Archives of Assyria Studies 23. Winona Lake: Eisenbrauns, 2015. (ISBN 978-952-10-1346-1)
- Women's writing of ancient Mesopotamia: an anthology of the earliest female authors (with Charles Halton). Cambridge: Cambridge University Press, 2017. (ISBN 978-1-107-05205-5)
- Johdatus akkadin kieleen [Introduction to the Akkadian language] (with Jouni Hautamäki). Suomen itämaisen seuran suomenkielisiä julkaisuja, 47 Helsinki: Suomen itämainen seura, 2021. ISSN 0359-7938. ISBN 978-951-9380-98-8
- Muinaisen Lähi-idän imperiumit: Kadonneiden suurvaltojen kukoistus ja tuho [The empires of the Middle East] (edited with Joanna Töyräänvuori). Helsinki: Gaudeamus, 2022. ISBN 978-952-345-171-1
