= List of Neo-Hittite kings =

List containing the known rulers of Neo-Hittite polities

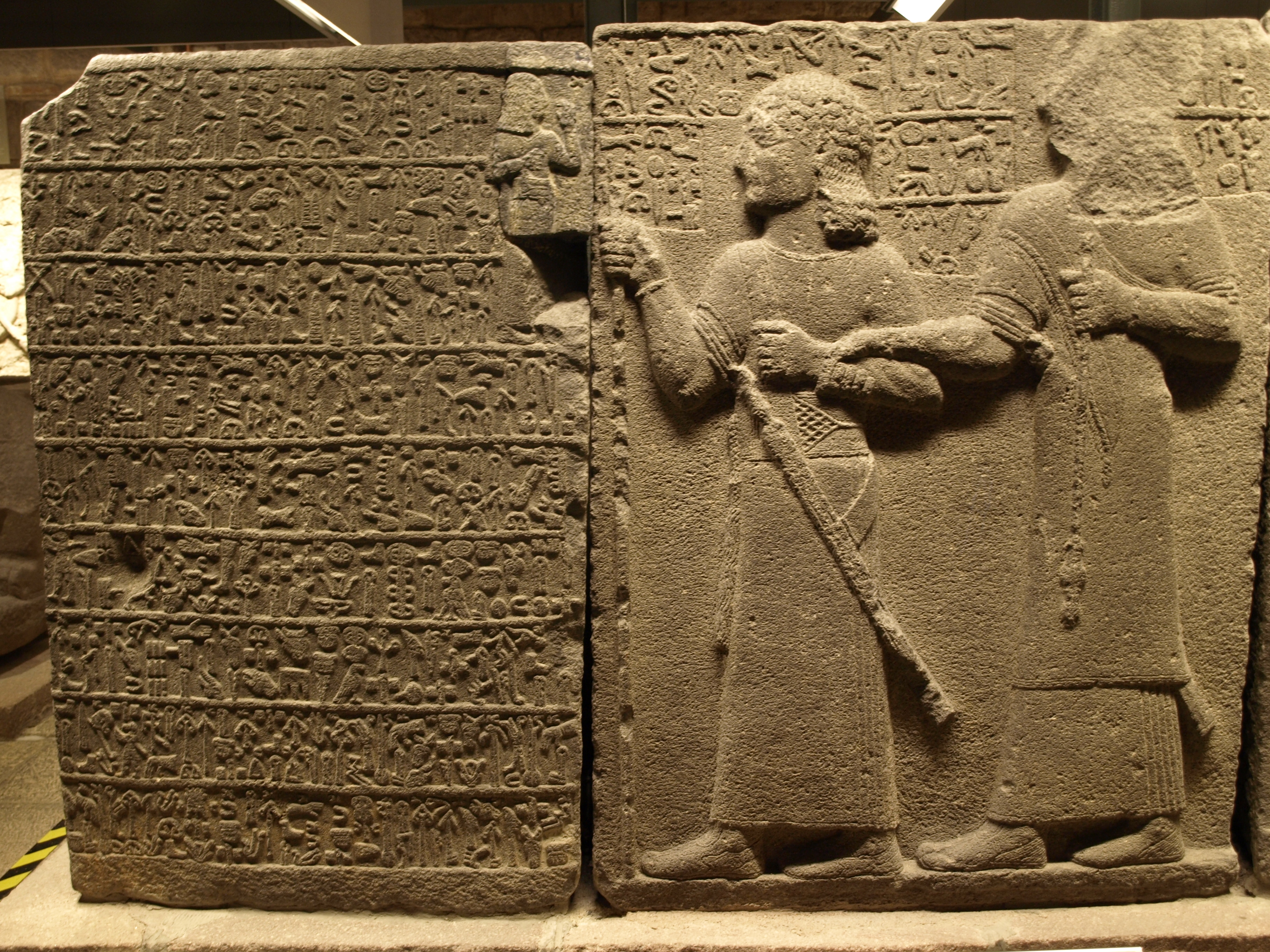
Yariri (r.) and Kamani (l.), successive rulers of the Neo-Hittite state Carchemish on a Hieroglyphic Luwian relief

The Neo-Hittite states are sorted according to their geographical position.

All annual details are BC.

The contemporary sources name the language they are written in. Those can be:

- Luwian (always using Luwian hieroglyphs)
- Hittite
- Aramaic
- Phoenician
- Assyrian
- Urartian
- Babylonian
- Hebrew (from Old Testament)

Also post-Neo-Hittite rulers and the Hittite viceroys of Carchemish are listed for completeness. Post-Neo-Hittite rulers are named as such.

== Euphrates region ==
=== Carchemish (Hittite Karkamissa, Luwian Karkamis) ===
For complete dynastic history also the Viceroys of Carchemish from the Hittite empire period are listed here.

Viceregal dynasty (dynasty of Tudḫaliya I)
Name	Reign	Notes	Sources
Piyassili/Šarri-Kušuḫ	ca. 1321 - 1309	first viceroy of Carchemish, son of Suppiluliuma I	Hittite
Sahurunuwa	since 1309	son of Piyassili/Šarri-Kušuḫ	Hittite
Ini-Teššub I	at the time of Hattusili III and Tudhaliya IV, about 60 years	son of Sahurunuwa	Hittite
Talmi-Teššub	at the time of Suppiluliuma II	son of Ini-Teššub I	Hittite
Dynasty of Great Kings (dynasty of Tudhaliya I continued)
Name	Reign	Notes	Sources
Kuzi-Teššub	ca. 1200/ early - mid 12th century/ 1180 - 1150	son of Talmi-Teššub; assumed the title of Great King of Carchemish	Luwian
Mazakarhuha	early - mid 12th century	reign unclear	Luwian
Ir-Teššub	mid/later 12th century	reign unclear, synonym Iri-Teššub	Luwian
Ini-Teššub II	ca. 1100/ later 12th - early 11th century	reign unclear	Assyrian
Tudhaliya	possibly 11th or 10th century	Reign unclear, possibly succeeded Uratarhunza instead, possibly preceded Ir-Teššub instead	Luwian
x-paziti	possibly later 11th or 10th century/ possibly early 10th century	possibly Sipaziti or Sapaziti	Luwian
Uratarhunza	possibly later 11th or 10th century	son of x-paziti	Luwian
Dynasty of Suhi
Name	Reign	Notes	Sources
Suhi I	possibly early 10th century		Luwian
Astuwalamanza	possibly mid 10th century	son of Suhi I, previously read Astuwatamanza	Luwian
Suhi II	possibly late 10th century	son of Astuwatamanza	Luwian
Katuwa	possibly 10th or early 9th century/ ca. 880?	son of Suhi II	Luwian
Sangara	ca. 870 - 848		Assyrian
Dynasty of Astiruwa
Name	Reign	Notes	Sources
Astiruwa	end 9th - beginning 8th century/ ca.848 - 790	synonym Astiru or Astiru I	Luwian
Yariri	early - mid 8th century/ ca. 790	"subject of Astiruwa", regent, possibly eunuch	Luwian
Kamani	early - mid 8th century/ ca. 760/ca. 738	son of Astiruwa	Luwian
Sastura	mid 8th century	reign unclear, vizier of Kamani	Luwian
son of Sastura	2nd half 8th century	possibly identical with Pisiri, possibly also known as Astiru II	Luwian
Pisiri	ca. 738 - 717		Assyrian

=== Melid (Luwian Malizi) ===
Dynasty of Kuzi-Teššub (dynasty of Tudḫaliya I)
Name	Reign	Notes	Sources
Kuzi-Teššub	ca. 1200/ early - mid 12th century/ 1180 - 1150	king of Carchemish	Luwian
PUGNUS-mili I	later 12th century	son of Kuzi-Teššub	Luwian
Runtiya	later 12th century	son of PUGNUS-mili I	Luwian
Arnuwanti I	later 12th century	brother of Runtiya	Luwian
PUGNUS-mili II	late 12th - early 11th century/ ca. 1112	son of Arnuwanti I, Assyrian possibly Allumari	Luwian, Assyrian?
Arnuwanti II	late 12th - early 11th century	son of PUGNUS-mili II	Luwian
PUGNUS-mili III	possibly 11th or early 10th century	reign unclear	Luwian
Dynasty of CRUS + RA/I-sa
Name	Reign	Notes	Sources
CRUS + RA/I-sa	possibly 11th - 10th century	name possibly Taras	Luwian
Wasu(?)runtiya	possibly 11th - 10th century	son of CRUS + RA/I-sa	Luwian
Halpasulupi	possibly 11th - 10th century	son of Wasu(?)runtiya	Luwian
Later rulers
Name	Reign	Notes	Sources
Suwarimi	possibly 11th or 10th century	reign unclear	Luwian
Mariti	possibly 11th or 10th century	son of Suwarimi	Luwian
Sahwi		identical with Sahu? Then later	Luwian
Sa(?)tiruntiya		identical with Hilaruada? Then later	Luwian
Lalli	min. 853 - 835		Assyrian
opponent of Zakur of Hamath	early 8th century	identical with Sahu/Sahwi?	Aramaic
Sahu	early 8th century	identical with Sahwi?	Urartian
unknown king	early 8th century	Urartian tributary, identical with Sahu?	Urartian
Hilaruada	ca. 784/780 - 760/750	Synonym Helaruada, identical with Sa(?)tiruntiya?	Urartian
Sulumal	743 - 732		Assyrian
Gunzinanu	ca. 720/719	deposed by Assyrians, synonym Gunzianu	Assyrian
Tarhunazi	ca. 719-712	installed by Assyrians instead of Gunzinanu	Assyrian
Muwatalli	713 - 708	Assyrian Mutallu, king of Kummuh, installed by Assyrians	Assyrian
Assyrian rule	since 708		Assyrian
Mugallu	675 - 651	independent king, post-Neo-Hittite ruler	Babylonian, Assyrian
x-ussi	ca. 640	son of Mugallu, post-Neo-Hittite ruler	Assyrian

=== Kummuh (Luwian Kummaḫa, Classical Commagene) ===
Name	Reign	Notes	Sources
Hattusili I	ca. 866 - ca. 857	Assyrian Qatazilu or Qatazili	Assyrian
Kundašpu	ca. 856/853	synonym Kundašpi	Assyrian
Suppiluliuma	805 - 773	Assyrian Ušpilulume, Assyrian tributary	Luwian, Assyrian
Hattusili II	mid 8th century	son of Suppiluliuma	Luwian
Kuštašpi	ca. 750/ ca. 755 - 730	Urartian and Assyrian tributary	Urartian, Assyrian
Muwatalli	712 - 708	Assyrian Mutallu, installed by Assyrians	Assyrian

=== Masuwari/Til Barsip/Bit-Adini ===
The two dynasties
Name	Reign	Notes	Sources
Hapatila	late 10th - early 9th century	dynasty A	Luwian
Ariyahina	late 10th - early 9th century	grandson of Hapatila, dynasty A	Luwian
father of Hamiyata	late 10th - early 9th century	usurper, dynasty B	Luwian
Hamiyata	late 10th - early 9th century	dynasty B	Luwian
son of Hamiyata	early - mid 9th century	dynasty B	Luwian
son of Ariyahina	mid 9th century	dynasty A	Luwian
Bit-Adini regime
Name	Reign	Notes	Sources
Ahuni	856/ 875 - 855		Assyrian

== Antitaurus region, Western Syrian region ==
=== Gurgum (Luwian Kurkuma) ===
Name	Reign	Notes	Sources
Astuwaramanza	late 11th century		Luwian
Muwatalli I	early 10th century	son of Astuwaramanza	Luwian
Larama I	ca. 950	son of Muwatalli I	Luwian
Muwizi	later 10th century	son of Larama I	Luwian
Halparuntiya I	earlier 9th century	son of Muwizi	Luwian
Muwatalli II	858	son of Halparuntiya I, Assyrian Mutallu	Luwian, Assyrian
Halparuntiya II	ca. 853/ 855 - 830	son of Muwatalli II, Assyrian Qalparunda	Luwian, Assyrian
Larama II	later 9th century	son of Halparuntiya II, Assyrian Palalam	Luwian, Assyrian
Halparuntiya III	805 - ca. 800/780	son of Larama II, Assyrian Qalparunda	Luwian, Assyrian
Tarhulara	743 - ca. 711		Assyrian
Muwatalli III	ca. 711	son of Tarhulara, Assyrian Mutallu	Assyrian

=== Pattin/Unqi/Palistin ===
Early rulers
Name	Reign	Notes	Sources
Taita	11th or 10th century	possibly Philistine, king of Tell Tayinat; also interpretable as two kings of the same name: Taita I in 11th century and Taita II in 10th century	Luwian
Manana	10th century		Luwian
Suppiluliuma I	10th century		Luwian
Halparuntiya I	10th century	reign unclear	Luwian
"Dynasty of Lubarna"
Name	Reign	Notes	Sources
Labarna I	ca. 875/870 - 858?	Assyrian Lubarna	Assyrian
Suppiluliuma II	858/857	Assyrian Sapalulme	Luwian, Assyrian
Halparuntiya II	858/857 - 853	Assyrian Qalparunda	Luwian, Assyrian
Labarna II	831/829	Assyrian Lubarna	Assyrian
Later rulers
Name	Reign	Notes	Sources
Surri	831	usurper	Assyrian
Sasi	831	Assyrian tributary	Assyrian
Tutammu	738		Assyrian

=== Hamath (Luwian Imat) ===
Early rulers
Name	Reign	Notes	Sources
Toi	early 10th century	synonym Tou	Old Testament (2 Samuel 8:9)
Dynasty of Parita
Name	Reign	Notes	Sources
Parita	1st half 9th century		Luwian
Urahilina	853 - 845	son of Parita, previously read Urhilina, Assyrian Irhuleni	Luwian, Assyrian
Uratami	ca. 830/840 - 820	son of Urahilina, Assyrian possibly Rudamu	Luwian, Assyrian?
Later rulers
Name	Reign	Notes	Sources
Zakur	ca. 800	synonym Zakkur	Aramaic
Eni-Ilu	738		Assyrian
Yau-bidi	720	synonym Ilu-bidi	Assyrian

== Central and South-Eastern Anatolian region ==
=== Tabal ===
Divides into Tabal "Proper" and other localities.

==== Tabal/Bit-Burutaš (Classical Cappadocia) ====
Name	Reign	Notes	Sources
Tuwati I	837	Assyrian Tuatti	Assyrian
Kikki	837	son of Tuwati I	Assyrian
Tuwati II	mid 8th century		Luwian
Wasusarma	ca. 740/38 - 730	son of Tuwati II, Assyrian Wassurme	Luwian, Assyrian
Hulli	730 - 726	Assyrian tributary	Assyrian
Ambaris	ca. 721 - 713	son of Hulli, deposed by Assyrians	Assyrian
Iškallu	ca. 679	synonym Iskallu	Assyrian
Mugallu	663, 651	post-Neo-Hittite ruler, identical with Mugallu, king of Malatya?	Assyrian
x-ussi	ca. 640	son of Mugallu, post-Neo-Hittite ruler, idental with x-ussi from Malatya?	Assyrian

==== Atuna (Luwian Tunna) ====
Name	Reign	Notes	Sources
Ušḫitti	ca. 740 - 732		Assyrian
Ashwis(i)	3rd quarter of 8th century	reign unclear, identical with Ušḫitti?	Luwian
Kurti	ca. 732/ 718 - 713	son of Ashwis(i), previously read Matti	Luwian, Assyrian

==== Ištunda/Ištuanda ====
Name	Reign	Notes	Sources
Tuhamme	738 - 732		Assyrian

==== Šinuḫtu ====
Name	Reign	Notes	Sources
Kiyakiya	718	Assyrian Kiakki oder Kiakku	Luwian, Assyrian

==== Tuwana (Classical Tyanitis) ====
Name	Reign	Notes	Sources
Warpalawa I	early 8th century	reign unclear	Luwian
Saruwani	1st half 8th century		Luwian
Muwaharani I	ca. 740		Luwian
Warpalawa II	ca. 740 - 705/ ca. 738 - 710	son of Muwaharani I, Assyrian Urballa, Urballu	Luwian, Assyrian
Muwaharani II	end 8th century	son of Warpalawa II	Luwian

==== Ḫupišna (Classical Cybistra) ====
Name	Reign	Notes	Sources
Puhamme	837		Assyrian
Urimme	ca. 740	synonym Uirimme	Assyrian

==== Kulummu/Til-garimmu ====
Name	Reign	Notes	Sources
Gurdi	705	Gurdī, unusual synonym Qurdī, previously read Ešpai or Hidi	Assyrian

==== Kaška ====
Name	Reign	Notes	Sources
Dadi-Ilu	738 - 732	synonym Dadi-Il or Dad-Ilu, Kaška probably identical with the Kaska of Hittite Sources	Assyrian

=== Cilicia ===
==== Que (Luwian Adanawa/Hiyawa, Classical Cilicia of the Plain) ====
Name	Reign	Notes	Sources
Kate	858 - 831	deposed by Assyrians	Assyrian
Kirri	831	brother of Kate, installed by Assyrians instead of Kate	Assyrian
Awariku	ca. 738 - 709/ ca. 730	synonym Warika, Assyrian Urikki	Luwian, Phoenician, Assyrian
Azatiwata	ca. 705	possibly regent, reign unclear	Luwian, Phoenician
son of Awariku	late 8th - early 7th century	reign unclear	Luwian, Phoenician

==== Hilakku (Classical Rough Cilicia) ====
Name	Reign	Notes	Sources
Pihirim	mid 9th century		Assyrian
Ambaris	ca. 718 - 713	king of Tabal	Assyrian
Sandasarme	ca.665	post-Neo-Hittite ruler	Assyrian

==== Tanakun ====
Name	Reign	Notes	Sources
Tulli	833	"Prince" of Tanakun	Assyrian

==== Illubru ====
Name	Reign	Notes	Sources
Kirua	696	"Prince" of Illubru, post-Neo-Hittite ruler	Assyrian

==== Kundu and Sizzu ====
Name	Reign	Notes	Sources
Sanduarri	678/676	"Prince" of Kundu and Sizzu, post-Neo-Hittite ruler, possibly identical with Azatiwata	Assyrian

==== Pirindu/Piriddu ====
Name	Reign	Notes	Sources
Appuašu	557	synonym Appuwašu, post-Neo-Hittite ruler	Babylonian

== Aramaean region ==
=== Bit-Agusi/Arpad ===
Name	Reign	Notes	Sources
Gusi	ca. 870	Dynasty founder	Assyrian
Hadram	ca. 860 - 830	son of Gusi, Assyrian Adramu or Arame	Assyrian
Attar-šumki I	ca. 830 - 800/ 805 - 796	son of Hadram, synonym Bar-Guš	Assyrian, Aramaic
Bar-Hadad	ca. 800	son of Attar-šumki I, reign unclear	Aramaic
Attar-šumki II	1st half 8th century	son of Bar-Hadad	Aramaic
Mati-Ilu	mid 8th century	son of Attar-šumki II	Aramaic

=== Y'adiya/Bit-Gabbari ===
Name	Reign	Notes	Sources
Gabbar	ca 920/ca. 900 - 880	Dynasty founder	Phoenician
Bamah	ca. 880 - 865	son of Gabbar	Phoenician
Hayya	ca. 865-840	son of Bamah	Phoenician, Assyrian
Ša-il	ca. 840 - 830	son of Hayya	Phoenician
Kilamuwa	ca. 830 - 820	brother of Ša-il	Phoenician

=== Sam'al/Siri'laya (Zincirli) ===
Name	Reign	Notes	Sources
Hayyanu	ca. 859 - 854	Dynasty founder	Assyrian
Ahabbu	ca. 854 - 825	son of Hayyanu?, confused with the biblical king Ahab	Assyrian
Qarli	ca. 825 - 790	son of Ahabbu?, he unified Sam'al and Y'DY	Aramaic
Panamuwa I	ca. 790 - 750	son of Qarli, synonym Panammu	Aramaic
Bar-Sur	ca. 750 - 745	son of Panamuwa I	Aramaic
usurper	ca. 745 - 740		Aramaic
Panamuwa II	ca. 743 - 727	son of Bar-Sur, synonym Panammu	Aramaic, Assyrian
Bar-Rakib	727 - 713/711	son of Panamuwa II	Aramaic, Luwian

=== Kasku/Kaska/Ktk ===
Name	Reign	Notes	Sources
Bar-Ga'ya	mid 8th century	Possibly an Assyrian high official, or Tiglath-Pileser III	

=== Zobah ===
Name	Reign	Notes	Sources
Hadadezer ben Rehob	at the time of Saul and David of Israel		Old Testament ( 1 Samuel 14:47, 2 Samuel 8:3-12)

=== Aram-Damascus ===
Name	Reign	Notes	Sources
Ben-Hadad I	ca. 880s(?)- 865	son of Tob-Rimmon	Old Testament (1 Kings 15:16-22)
Ben-Hadad II (a.k.a Hadad-ezer)	ca. 865 - 842	son of Ben-Hadad I, Assyrian Adad-Idri	Assyrian, Old Testament (1 Kings 20-22)
Hazael	ca. 842 - 796	usurper (Old Testament), "son of a nobody" (Assyrian)	Assyrian, Old Testament (2 Kings 8:7-15; 13:3)
Ben-Hadad III	ca. 796 - 792	son of Hazael, Aramaic Bir-Hadad	Aramaic, Assyrian, Old Testament (2 Kings 13:3, 24-25)
Mari	824 - 790	son of Hazael?	Assyrian
Hadyan II	ca. 775? - mid 8th century	Assyrian Hadiiani	Assyrian
Rezin	754 - 732	Assyrian Rahianu	Assyrian, Old Testament (2 Kings 16:5-9)

== See also ==
- List of Hittite kings
