= Tell Aushariye =

Archaelogical site

- تل أحمر (Arabic)
- Location within Syria
- 36°39′16.62″N 38°4′7.96″E
- Type: settlement
- Location: Syria

Site notes
- Condition: Ruins

Tell Aushariye/Pitru (Hittite: Pitru; Assyrian: Ana-Aššur-utēr-aṣbat) is an archaeological site and fortress on the Sajur River (Assyrian: Sagurri, Sagurru, Sagura) on the western bank and at its confluence with the Euphrates River. It was located at a strategical point, acting as a fortress at a crossing of the Euphrates in connection to the regional capital, Til-Barsip and south of Carchemish (20 km/12.5 miles).

== History ==
=== Chalcolithic ===
The site was first occupied in the 4th millennium BCE with pottery sherds belonging to the local Chalcolitihic tradition.

=== Early Bronze Age ===
==== Transitional EB IVB/MB IA ====
Level IX around 2020-2000 BCE. The occupation ended abruptly.

=== Middle Bronze Age ===
In Area G, there are 3 levels dating to the MBA.

==== Middle Bronze I ====
Level VIII.

==== Middle Bronze II ====
In Middle Bronze IIA (c. 1820-1630 BCE), the western bank of the Euphrates River, south of Carhcemish down to Emar, was part of the Great Kingdom of Yamhad (Aleppo). There were warfare between Sumu-Epuh of Yamhad (d. 1881 BCE) in the west and Shamshi-Adad I (r. 1808-1775 BCE) in Upper Mesopotamia. Forts along the Euphrates became important to hold the border. Excavators suggest Aushariye was a fort known as Dur-Shamshi-Adad or Dur-Sumu-Epuh.

Level VIII. Level VII. Level VI. Belongs to the 17th century BCE. Fire.

=== Late Bronze Age ===
The Late Bronze Age followed the Fall of the Great Kingdom of Yamhad (Aleppo) in Syria after attacks by Hattusili I and Mursili I of Hatti, which culminated in the Sack of Babylon around 1587 BCE. In the wake of this came the Rise of the Kingdom of Mitannin in Upper Mesopotamia.

==== Mitanni period ====
In Area G, the earliest Level V was built on top of the burnt rooms of MBA Level VI. The ruined houses and city walls were used as a quarry for new houses. Thus, there had been a hiatus before the new Level V represents the early Mitanni period.

==== Hittite period ====
Following the Siege of Carchemish by Suppiluliuma I of Hatti around 1345 BCE and the assassination of Tushratta of Mitanni, this part of the Euphrates River came under the administration of the Hittite Kingdom of Carchemish (viceroyalty).

Pitru (also Pitar or Pidru) functioned within the administrative sphere of the viceroyalty of Carchemish. Hittite administration in Syria relied on a network of local city-states and fortresses to manage transit and trade; Pitru was one such node that allowed the Hittites to monitor movement along the Euphrates.

==== Transitional LBA/IA ====
Level IV.

=== Iron Age ===
In the Iron Age, this region saw the rise of Neo-Hittite city-states, then became Aramean before being conquered by the Neo-Assyrian Empire.

==== Iron I ====
- Level III

Iron IB. Pitru was conquered by Assyrian ruler Tiglath-Pileser I in c. 1100 BCE, but it was later seized by the Arameans.

==== Iron II ====
- Level II

Following the Neo-Hittite period, it came under the Arameans. Pitru became subject to Til-Barsip and the Aramean Bit-Adini dynasty in the 9th century, the fortress and crossing became the target of the Neo-Assyrian mitary campaign of Shalmaneser III in his Year 3 (856 BCE). It was later given an Assyrian name in Shalmaneser's sixth year, becoming a base of operations for further military campaigns.

Shalmaneser Letter 010: "In my third regnal year, Aḫūnu of (Bīt-)Adini (lit. "son of Adīnu") became frightened in the face of my mighty weapons and abandoned the city Tīl-Barsip (Barsaip), his royal city. He crossed the Euphrates River. I took as my own (i 40) the city Ana-Aššur-utēr-aṣbat, which is on the other side of the Euphrates River, by the Sagurri River, which the people of Ḫatti call the city Pitru. On my return march, (i 45) I entered the pass of the land Alzi (and) I captured the lands Alzi, Suḫnu, Daiaeni, (and) Tumme, the city Arṣaškun, the land Gilzānu, (and) the city Ḫubuškia."

- Pitru is mentioned 6x times in letters by Shalmaneser (002, 006, 010, 014, 016), while Ana-Aššur-utēr-aṣbat is mentioned 5 times by Shalmaneser III (002, 010, 014, 016) and 2 times by Adad-Nerari III (006, 007).

== Excavations ==
A Danish team of archaeologists started excavating the site in 2000, as part of the Tishrin Dam rescue efforts. The numbering of levels and reports are confusing, as the team discovered a new Level IV at the transition of LBA/IA and was forced to reassigned the other levels upwards.

== Theories ==
=== Bible ===
==== Book of Numbers ====
Pitru is frequently equated with Pethor (Numbers 22:5), the home of the prophet Balaam, based on the geographical descriptions provided in the Assyrian texts placing it near the Euphrates and the Sajur River.

== Sources ==
- Bryce, Trevor., The Routledge Handbook of The People and Places of Ancient Western Asia: The Near East from the Early Bronze Age to the fall of the Persians Empire
- Hogarth, D. G. (David George), 1862–1927, The Ancient East
- Luckenbill, Daniel D., Ancient Records of Assyria and Babylonia, Vol. 1: Historical Records of Assyria, from the earliest times to Sargon, (Chicago: University of Chicago Press) 1926.

== See also ==
- Tell Aushariye – Danish Excavations in Syria
