= Sangara (king) =

King of Carchemish

Sangara or Sangar was a king of Carchemish. He belonged to the House of Suhi of Carchemish, and ruled from 870 to 848 BC.

== History ==
Sangara likely accessed the throne of Carchemish only a short time after king Katuwa known from Hieroglyphic Luwian sources.

Prior to a discovery of new evidence in 2015, he was only mentioned in texts of the Assyrian kings Ashurnasirpal II and Shalmaneser III. In 2015 he was identified in Hieroglyphic Luwian by the Turco-Italian Archaeological Expedition at Karkemish.

=== Ashurnasirpal II of Assyria ===
First, Sangara was a tributary of Ashurnasirpal II. In 870 BC (alternative dating: 882 BC) the Assyrian king crossed the Euphrates and first turned against Carchemish. Facing the Assyrian army Sangara capitulated quickly and paid a rich tribute because Carchemish was one of the wealthiest Syro-Hittite states of that time. He also had to send his chariotry, cavalry and infantry to support the Assyrian army. In return Sangara and Carchemish were spared by the Assyrians.

=== Shalmaneser III of Assyria ===
In 858 BC Sangara participated in an anti-Assyrian coalition against Shalmaneser III which was formed by Aḫuni of Bit Adini, Hayyanu of Sam'al, Šuppiluliuma of Pattin and himself. They attacked the Assyrian army on the territory of Sam'al but were repelled. The uprising of Carchemish continued until Shalmaneser III destroyed the fortified city of Sazabu on the territory of Carchemish in 857 BC. Sangara capitulated and paid rich tribute.

In 853 BC, Sangara paid tribute to the Assyrians again.

In 849 BC, Sangara tried uprising again, this time forming an alliance with Hadram of Bit Agusi. Shalmaneser III invaded the state of Carchemish, destroying and burning several cities in Sangara's dominion. Sangara capitulated but not for long. In 848 BC, Hadram and he uprose again Shalmaneser III reacted by capturing and destroying 97 of Sangara's cities. For the period after 848 BC nothing more is known about Sangara but it is likely stayed on his throne as a faithful vassal of the Assyrian king as his ally Hadram of Bit Agusi did.

== Literature ==
- Trevor Bryce: The World of the Neo-Hittite Kingdoms: A Political and Military History. Oxford University Press: Oxford, New York 2012. ISBN 978-0-19-921872-1

Preceded by Katuwa	King of Carchemish; 870-848 BC	Succeeded by Aštiruwa
