= Tony Wilkinson =

British archaeologist (1948–2014)

- Born: Tony James Wilkinson; 14 August 1948
- Died: 25 December 2014 (aged 66)
- Other names: Tony J. Wilkinson; T. J. Wilkinson
- Citizenship: British
- Education: Birkbeck, University of London; McMaster University
- Awards: Fellow of the British Academy (2008)
- Scientific career
- Fields: Landscape archaeology Ancient Near East
- Workplaces: British School of Archaeology in Iraq; University of Chicago; University of Edinburgh; Durham University

Tony James Wilkinson, FBA (14 August 1948 – 25 December 2014) was a British archaeologist and academic, specialising in landscape archaeology and the Ancient Near East. He was Professor of Archaeology at the University of Edinburgh from 2005 to 2006, and Professor of Archaeology at Durham University from 2006 to until his death in 2014.

== Early life ==
Wilkinson was born on 14 August 1948 and was brought up in Essex, England. From 1966 to 1969, he studied geography at Birkbeck, University of London, graduating with a Bachelor of Science (BSc) degree. He then undertook post-graduate study at McMaster University, Ontario, Canada, graduating from there with a Master of Science (MSc) degree in 1972. He never undertook a doctorate.

== Academic career ==
Wilkinson worked as a consultant landscape archaeologist from 1972 to 1989. Between 1989 and 1992, he was the assistant director of the British School of Archaeology in Iraq. From 1995 to 2003, he worked at the University of Chicago, first as a research associate and then as an associate professor. During the 1990s, he founded the 'Center for Ancient Middle Eastern Landscapes' of the Oriental Institute, University of Chicago.

In 2003, he returned to the United Kingdom to become a lecturer at the University of Edinburgh. He was promoted to Professor of Near Eastern Archaeology in 2005. In 2006, he left Edinburgh to become Professor of Archaeology at Durham University. In addition to his research and teaching within the Department of Archaeology, he was involved with Durham's Institute of Advanced Study.

Wilkinson had undertaken archaeological surveys in northern Syria, Iran and northern Iraq. He worked with declassified CORONA satellite images to research ancient sites and landscapes of Upper Mesopotamia. He was director of the Land of Carchemish project investigating the surrounding landscape of Carchemish, a Bronze Age capital city.

== Personal life ==
In 1995, Wilkinson married Eleanor Rose Barbanes. She is also an archaeologist, and collaborated with her husband on a number of projects and publications.

He died on 25 December 2014 from cancer.

== Honours ==
Wilkinson received two awards for his monograph titled Archaeological Landscapes of the Near East: the Society for American Archaeology Book Award in 2004 and the James R. Wiseman Book Award by the Archaeological Institute of America in 2005. In 2008, he was elected Fellow of the British Academy (FBA), the UK's national academy for the humanities and the social sciences. In 2009, he was awarded the John Coles Medal for Landscape Archaeology by the British Academy. The medal is awarded biennially 'for distinguished achievements in landscape archaeology'.

A memorial volume, New Agendas in Remote Sensing and Landscape Archaeology in the Near East: Studies in Honour of Tony J. Wilkinson was published in 2020, edited and containing chapters by many of Wilkinson's former students.

== Works ==
- Wilkinson, T. J. (1990). Town & Country in Southeastern Anatolia: Settlement and landuse at Kurban Höyük and other sites in the Lower Karababa Basin. Chicago, Il: Oriental Institute of the University of Chicago. ISBN 0918986648.
- Wilkinson, T. J.; Tucker, D. J. (1995). Settlement development in the North Jazira, Iraq: a study of the archeological landscape. Baghdad: British School of Archeology in Iraq. ISBN 0856686581.
- Wilkinson, T. J. (1995). The archaeology of the Essex coast. Gressenhall: Essex County Council Archaeology Section in conjunction with the Scole Archaeological Committee. ISBN 1852811196.
- Wilkinson, T. J. (2003). Archaeological landscapes of the Near East. Tucson, Arizona: University of Arizona Press. ISBN 0816521735.
- Wilkinson, Tony J. (2004). On the margin of the Euphrates: settlement and land use at Tell es-Sweyhat and in the upper lake Assad area, Syria. Chicago, Il: Oriental Institute of the University of Chicago. ISBN 1885923295.
- Sauer, E. W.; Rekavandi Omrani, H.; Wilkinson, T. J.; Nokandeh, J. (2012). Persia's imperial power in late antiquity: The great wall of Gorgan and the frontier landscapes of Sasanian Iran. Oxford: Oxbow Books. ISBN 978-1842175194.
- Wilkinson, T. J.; Gibson, M.; Widell, M., eds. (2013). Models of Mesopotamian landscapes: how small-scale processes contributed to the growth of early civilizations. Oxford: Archaeopress. ISBN 978-1407311739.
