= Yahdul-Lim =

King of Carchemish
- Reign: c. 1764 – c. 1745 BC
- Predecessor: Yatar-Ami
- Successor: Aplah-anda II
- Died: c. 1745 BC
- Father: Aplahanda

Yahdul-Lim (died c. 1745 BC) was a king of Carchemish proposed to have reigned between 1764 and 1745 BC. During this period, the information about Carchemish mostly comes from the archives of Mari, Syria.

== Family ==
Son of Aplahanda, he succeeded his brother Yatar-Ami. Little is known about his reign.

Alternatively: Ya‘dun-Li’im, son of Bin-Ami, and successor of Yatar-Ami on the throne of Karkemish. Moreover, this new find makes it clear that Ya‘dun-Li’im was not a son of the famous Aplah-Anda, as was erroneously held previously, but rather a scion of a secondary branch of the royal family.

== Reign ==
Yatar-Ami may have been a client of Mari. Yahdul-Lim, on the other hand, may have returned to an alliance with Yamhad. This probably happened after Hammurabi conquered Mari around 1761 BC. Thereafter the history of Carchemish is unknown for a considerable time.

Preceded by Yatar-Ami	King of Carchemish c. 1764 – c. 1745 BC	Succeeded by Aplah-anda II
