= Til Barsip =

Archaeological site in Aleppo, Syria

- تل أحمر (Arabic)
- Masuwari, Tell Ahmar
- Location within Syria
- 36.674°N 38.121°E
- Type: Settlement
- Periods: Mittani, Neo-Assyrian
- Location: Syria
- Region: Aleppo Governorate

Site notes
- Area: 50 hectares (120 acres)
- Excavation dates: 1929-1931
- Archaeologists: François Thureau-Dangin, Guy Bunnens
- Condition: Ruins
- Management: Directorate-General of Antiquities and Museums
- Public access: Yes

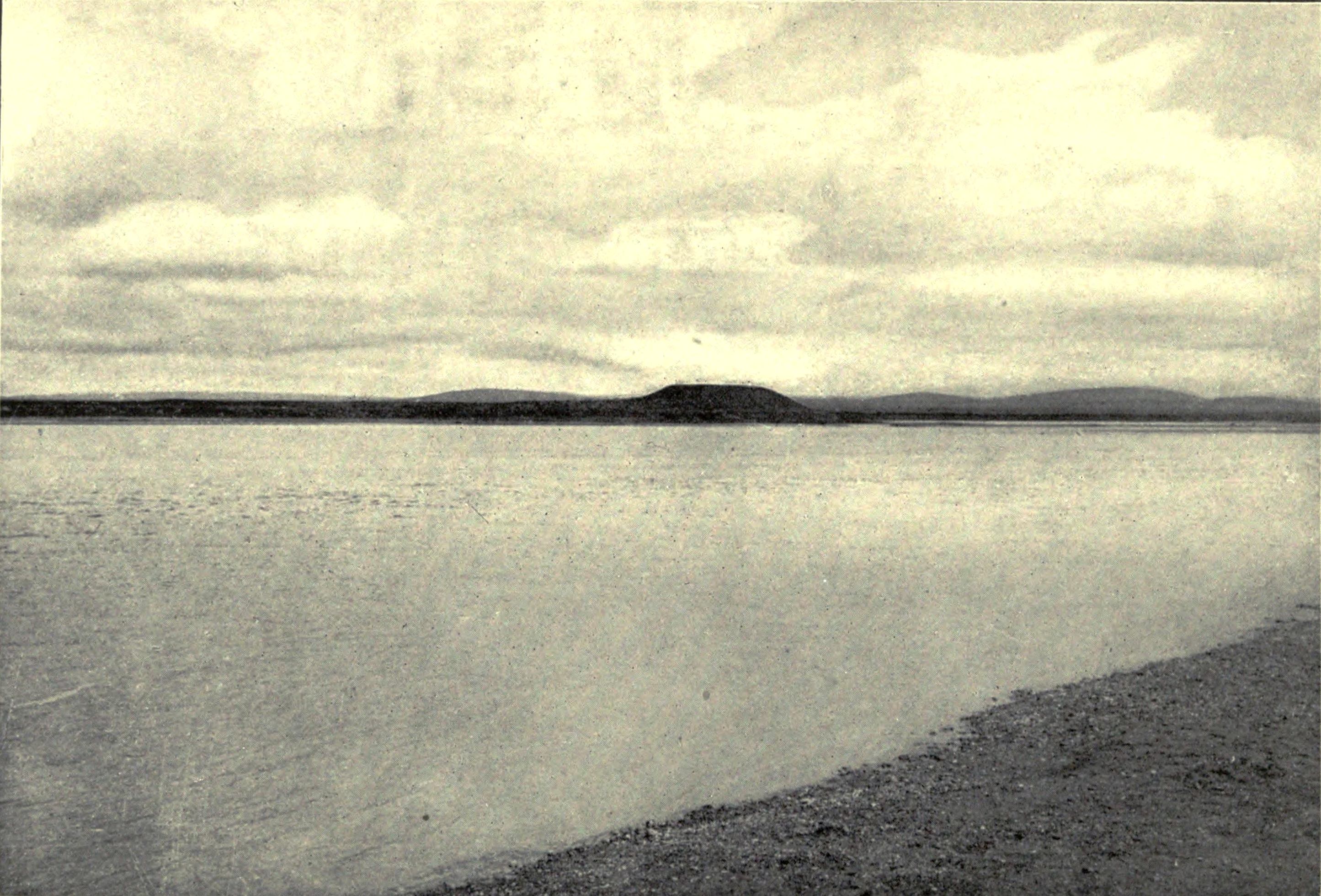
Tell Ahmar Across the Euphrates. 1910.

Til Barsip or Til Barsib (Hittite Masuwari, modern Tell Ahmar; Arabic: تل أحمر) is an ancient site situated in Aleppo Governorate, Syria by the Euphrates river about 20 kilometers south of ancient Carchemish.

== History ==
The site was inhabited as early as the Neolithic period.

=== Early Bronze Age ===
An important city arising in Early Bronze III and being completely destroyed in EBIV.

=== Iron Age ===
==== Neo-Hittite period ====
It is the remains of the Iron Age city which is the most important settlement at Tell Ahmar. It was known in Hittite as Masuwari. The city remained largely Neo-Hittite up to its conquest by the Neo-Assyrian Empire in the 856 BC and the Luwian language was used even after that. Til Barsip was the capital of the Aramean-speaking Neo-Hittite state of Bît Adini.

==== Assyrian period ====
After being captured by the Assyrians from its previous king Ahuni, the city was then renamed as Kar-Šulmānu-ašarēdu, after the Assyrian king Shalmaneser III, though its original name continued in use. It became a prominent center for the Assyrian administration of the region due to its strategic location at a crossing of the Euphrates river.

==== Til Barsip and Carchemish ====
After Til Barsip was occupied by Shalmaneser III, the important nearby city of Karkamish (Carchemish), only 20 km upstream the Euphrates river, remained under the rule of local kings of the House of Suhi. The Assyrian sources appear mostly silent about Karkamish until the mid-8th century BC. The only exception was a brief mention by Samši-Adad V (824–811 BC). The Assyrians may have left Karkamish alone either because of its strength, or because they profited from the extensive trade that the city conducted with many locations.

Probably around 848 BC, the change of dynasty at Carchemish took place, and the House of Astiruwa started to rule. Carchemish was finally conquered by Sargon II in 717 BC.

== Archaeology ==
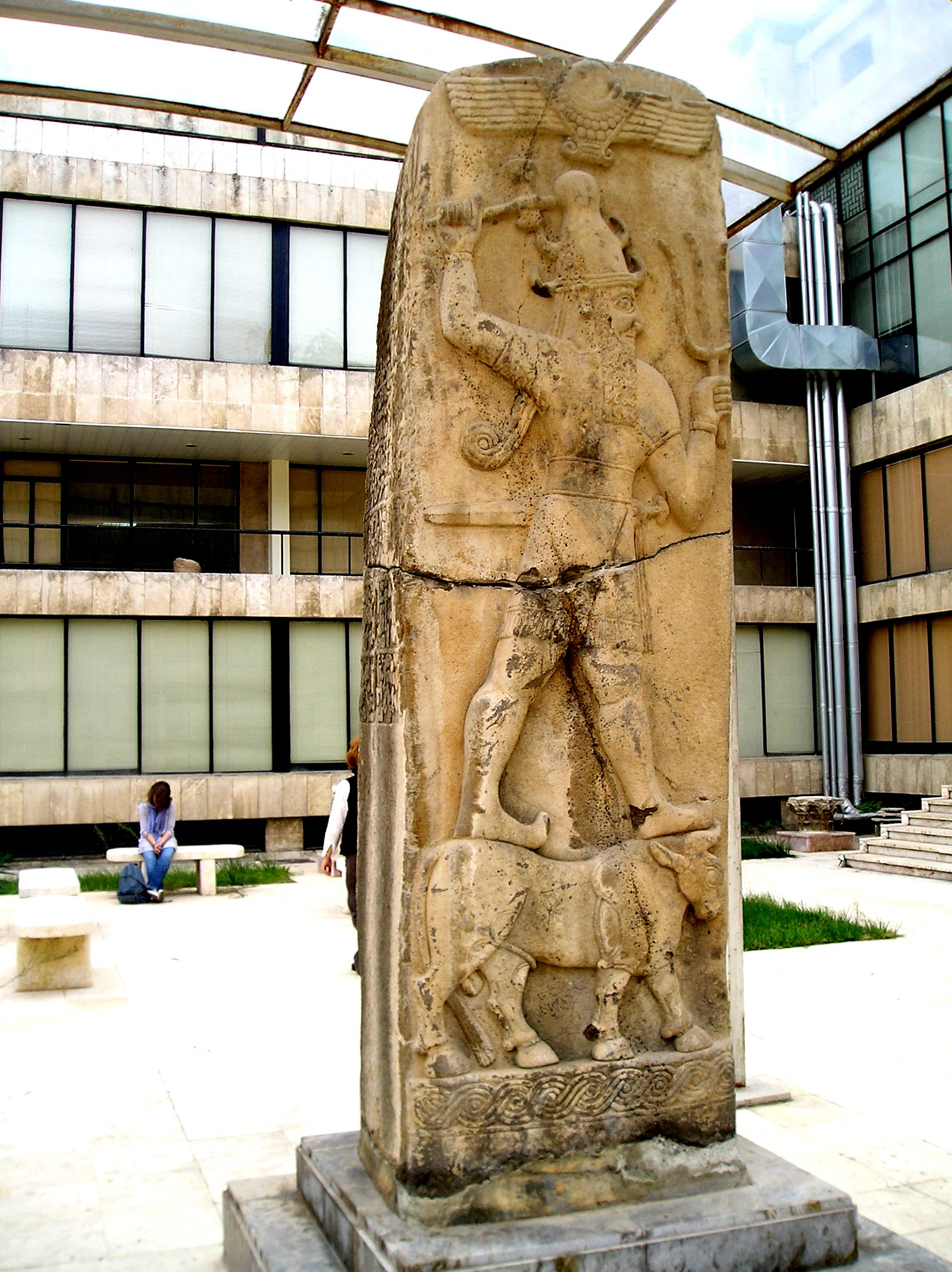
The Neo-Hittite Ahmar/Qubbah stele, discovered in the Euphrates just downriver from the site of Til Barsip. Dated circa 900 BC.

The tell was first excavated and examined by David George Hogarth, who proposed the identification as Til Barsip. Other than this research Hogarth was less interested with Tell Ahmar and Til Barsib and his only other discussion of the site is in a paper written in 1909 where it is only mentioned in name alone.

The site was visited in 1909 by Gertrude Lowthian Bell who wrote about the town and also took photographs squeezes from some of the inscriptions and other finds there. The site of Tell Ahmar was excavated by the French archaeologist François Thureau-Dangin from 1929 to 1931. He uncovered the Iron Age city and an Early Bronze Age hypogeum burial with a large amount of pottery. Three important steles were also discovered at the site. These record how the 8th century BC Aramean king Bar Ga'yah, who may be identical with the Assyrian governor Shamshi-ilu, made a treaty with the city of Arpad. Recent excavations at Tell Ahmar were conducted by Guy Bunnens from the University of Melbourne in the late 1980s and through to the present. Excavations ended in 2010. Many ivory carvings of outstanding quality were discovered and these were published in 1997. Current excavations are under the auspices of the University of Liège, Belgium.

=== Ahmar/Qubbah stele (Tell Ahmar 6) ===
Among the early Iron Age monuments discovered in the area was a particularly well-preserved stele known as the Ahmar/Qubbah stele, inscribed in Luwian, which commemorates a military campaign by king de:Hamiyata of Masuwari around 900 BC. The stele also attests to the continued cult of the deity 'Tarhunzas of the Army', whom Hamiyatas is thought to have linked with Tarhunzas of Heaven and with the Storm-God of Aleppo. This stele also indicates that the first king of Masuwari was named Hapatila, which may represent an old Hurrian name Hepa-tilla.

According to Woudhuizen, the name Hamiatas could also be understood as a Luwian reflection of Semitic Ammi-Ad(d)a (‘Hadad is my paternal uncle'), and Hapatilas as Abd-Ila ('servant of El').

Hamiatas also set up some other Luwian hieroglyphic inscriptions. These are known as Tell Ahmar 2, 4 and 5, and Borowski 3. Hamiatas is also mentioned in an inscription Tell Ahmar 1 by one of his successors referred to as "Ariahinas’ son", as well as in the inscription Aleppo 2 by a confederate named Arpas.

== Kings of Masuwari ==
- Hapatilla
- Hamiyatas
- Bar Ga'yah
- Shamshi-ilu (governor)

== See also ==
- Cities of the ancient Near East
- Short chronology timeline
- Euphrates Syrian Pillar Figurines
- Euphrates Handmade Syrian Horses and Riders
