= Aplahanda =

King of Carchemish
- Reign: c. 1786 – c. 1765 BC
- Successor: Yatar-Ami
- Died: c. 1765 BC
- Issue: Yatar-Ami; Yahdul-Lim; Matrunna

Aplahanda (died c. 1765 BC) was a king of Carchemish proposed to have reigned between 1786 and 1765 BC, during the early Middle Bronze IIA (c. 1820-1750 BC).

== Family ==
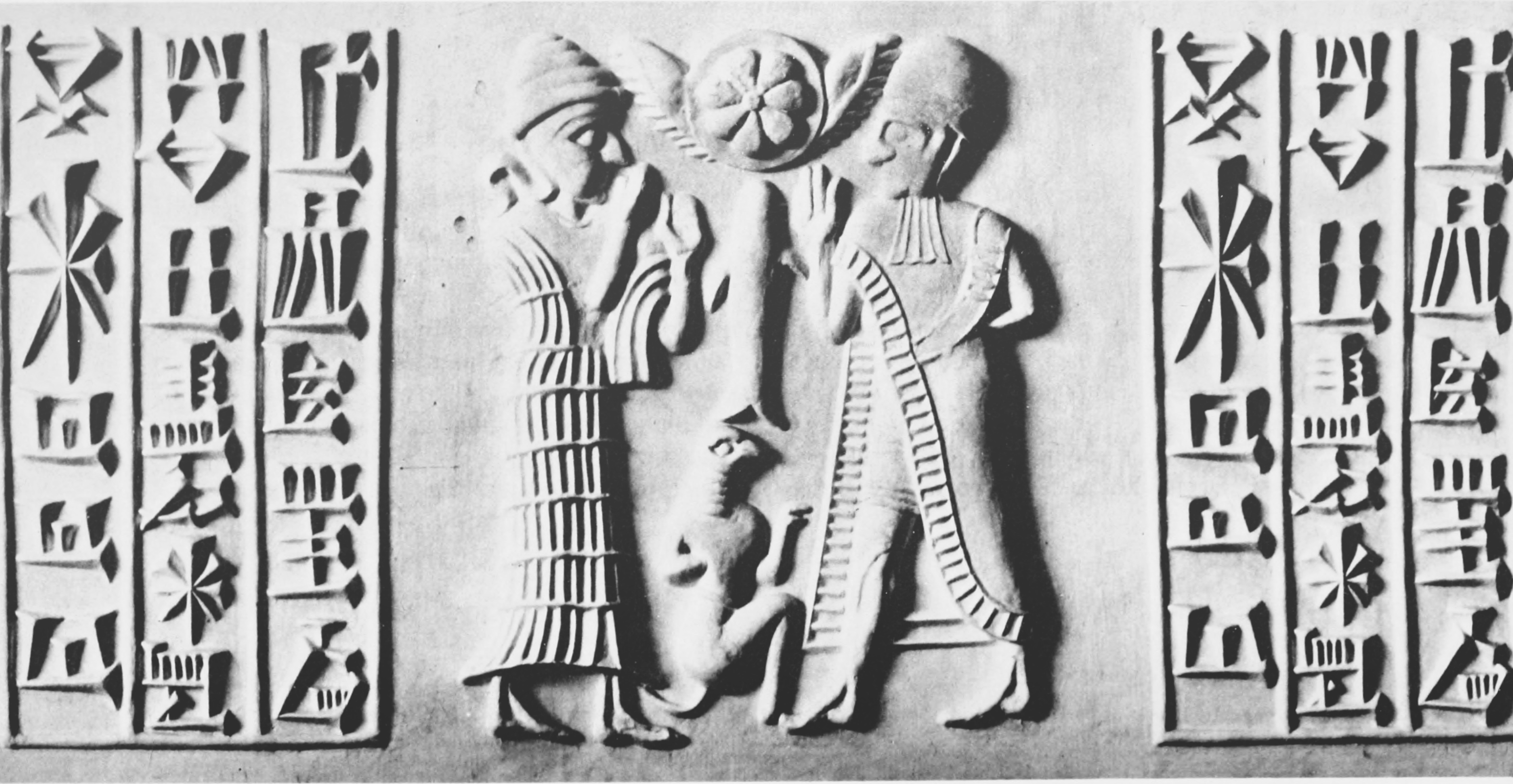
A seal dedicated to goddess Kubaba by Matrunna, daughter of Aplahanda, 18th century BC

His daughter called Matrunna is also known; she had a non-Semitic, possibly Hurrian name. His other son was Yahdul-Lim.

== Reign ==
Aplahanda had a long reign spanning several decades.

=== Relations with Anatolian city-states ===
In Anatolia, Aplahanda conducted trade through the Assyrian Trade Network with Kanesh (Level Ib). At Acemhöyük (Anatolia), bullae the Sarıkaya Palace yielded 15 impressions of two seals belonging to Aplahanda of Carchemish.

=== Relations with Shamshi-Adad I ===
He was allied with Shamshi-Adad I in a war against Sumu-Epuh of Aleppo (Yamhad) that was unsuccessful. Around 1776 BC (REL 197), the Death of Shamshi-Adad I occurred in Year 18 of Hammurabi of Babylon. This significantly changed the power dynamics in the region.

=== Relations with Yasmah-Adad of Mari ===
The Fall of Mari saw Shamshi-Adad I install his son Yasmah-Adad on the throne of Mari. Aplahanda corresponded with Yasmah-Adad.

Mari Archive (ARM V (Archives Royales de Mari, Volume 5):

- ARM V, 1: A report from Apla-handa informing Yasmah-Adad about the movements of Sumu-Epuh (the King of Yamhad). This letter highlights the tension between the Assyrian-Carchemish alliance and the hostile Aleppo dynasty.
- ARM V, 17: Concerns the movement of messengers. Apla-handa warns Yasmah-Adad that messengers from a foreign power (likely from the west or Anatolia) are heading toward Mari and should be monitored.
- ARM V, 20: Apla-handa discusses a dispute over territory or borders and suggests a diplomatic way to resolve it without escalating to a full-blown conflict that would require Shamshi-Adad’s intervention.
- ARM V, 5: Apla-handa confirms the dispatch of wine and honey. This letter is famous for its polite but firm tone regarding the quality of the jars used for transport.
- ARM V, 6: Apla-handa mentions sending garments and specifically "mountain goods" (likely items from the Taurus or Amanus mountains) to Yasmah-Adad as tokens of their "brotherhood."
- ARM V, 7: Apla-handa writes to Yasmah-Adad regarding a physician (asū). He mentions that he is sending a specialist to Mari and requests that Yasmah-Adad treat him well and eventually send him back.
- ARM V, 11: Concerns a leatherworker. Apla-handa asks for a specific craftsman to be sent to Carchemish to assist with the production of military or luxury equipment.

=== Relations with Zimri-Lim of Mari ===
Around 1775 BC, following the death of Shamshi-Adad I, Aplahanda established close relations with Zimri-Lim of Mari, addressing each other's as "brothers" (ahu; equal status, peers). This enabled trade to flourish from Carchemish downstream the Euphrates to Mari.

=== Death ===
He is known to have died based on a letter of Ishtaran-Nasir a high official from Tell Leilan. Aplahanda was succeeded by his son, Yatar-Ami, who ruled for only two years.

Dendrochronology indicate that Aplahanda died around REL 208 (c. 1765 BC).

=== Reconstruction ===
Regnal Years
Year	REL	Event
178x	REL XXX	Alliance with Shamshi-Adad I against Sumu-Epuh of Yamhad
17xx	REL XXX	
c. 1784 BC	REL 188	
c. 1783 BC	REL 189	
c. 1782 BC	REL 190	
c. 1781 BC	REL 191	
c. 1780 BC	REL 192	Yarim-Lim of Yamhad succeeds Sumu-Epuh around this time
c. 1779 BC	REL 193	
c. 1778 BC	REL 194	
c. 1777 BC	REL 195	
c. 1776 BC	REL 196	Shamshi-Adad I dies; Year 18 of Hammurabi of Babylon (synchronization)
c. 1775 BC	REL 197	Zimri-Lim begins to rule Mari
c. 1774 BC	REL 198	
c. 1773 BC	REL 199	
c. 1772 BC	REL 200	
c. 1771 BC	REL 201	
c. 1770 BC	REL 202	
c. 1769 BC	REL 203	
c. 1768 BC	REL 204	
c. 1767 BC	REL 205	
c. 1766 BC	REL 206	
c. 1765 BC	REL 207	Aplahanda dies around this time, Yatar-Ami succeeds Aplahanda
c. 1764 BC	REL 208	
c. 1763 BC	REL 209	
c. 1762 BC	REL 210	

== Attestations ==
He was first known from a cylinder seal translated by Rene Dussaud in 1929. The seal was found at the base of the mound of Ugarit before excavations began.

At least 6 seals naming Aplahanda have been published. They are skilfully produced, and show mostly Babylonian influence, although some Syrian and Egyptian motifs are also present.

He is also found mentioned in the Mari tablets, reigning at the same time as Yasmah-Adad and Zimri-Lim, by whom he is addressed as a brother. His name was suggested to be Amorite by I. J. Gelb and the hypothesis of a Semitic origin was supported by Wilfred Lambert.

Preceded by	King of Carchemish c. 1786 – c. 1765 BC	Succeeded by Yatar-Ami
