= Land of Carchemish project =

The Land of Carchemish Project was a large archaeological research project at Durham University focusing on the archaeological site of Carchemish in northern Syria. It started in 2006 and was directed by Tony Wilkinson and Edgar Peltenburg. It built upon the Jerablus Tahtani Project directed by Professor Peltenburg and is part of the Fragile Crescent Project at Durham University, which aims to advance understanding of the settlement landscapes of Upper Mesopotamia and the northern Levant. Investigations were undertaken in conjunction with the DGAM in Damascus until 2010, after which date it was stopped by the Syrian Civil War.

The Land of Carchemish Project has benefited from the funding and sponsorship of the Council for British Research in the Levant, and continued with funding from the British Academy, and for the 2010 field season from the Global Heritage Fund. It was designed with the aim of redressing the imbalance in archaeological survey work which has resulted from the large number of rescue excavations instigated as a result of the creation of dams on the Euphrates. The Project aimed to provide a broader landscape context to the ancient major site of Carchemish, investigating the terrain away from the river. It has demonstrated that the area was well settled throughout the Holocene period and that the seemingly dense settlement of the Euphrates Valley continues away from the river valley towards the west. Consequently, the ‘abundant pasture lands’ posited as a requirement of the models of tribal states need to be fitted within a landscape of settlement, and presumably control, by a number of local communities. Although there is some attenuation into the uplands, the presence of dense settlement in relatively minor valleys such as the Nahr al Amarna as well as on the upland plains to the west, provides a counterweight to the better known spreads of settlement along the Euphrates.
