= Kilamuwa Stela =

9th century BC stele

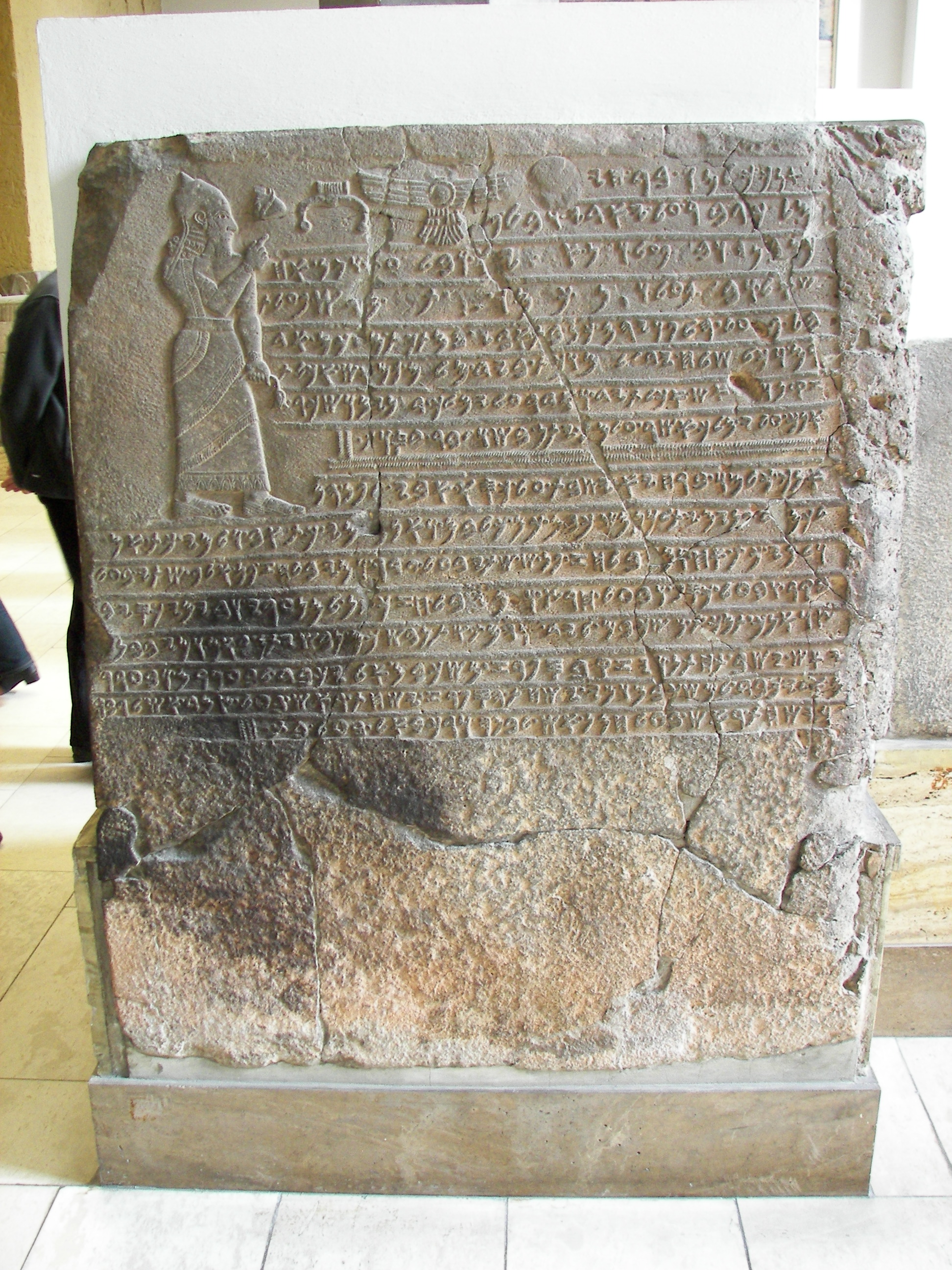
- Created: c. 838 BC
- Discovered: c. 1890; Gaziantep, Turkey
- Present location: Berlin, Germany
- Language: Phoenician

The Kilamuwa Stele is a 9th-century BC stele of King Kilamuwa, from the Kingdom of Bit-Gabbari. He claims to have succeeded where his ancestors had failed, in providing for his kingdom. The inscription is known as KAI 24.

The Kilamuwa Stele was discovered in Samʾal during the 1888–1902 German Oriental Society expeditions led by Felix von Luschan and Robert Koldewey. At the time of its discovery, it was considered to be the only Phoenician text found in Samʾal (numerous Aramaic texts had been found) and the northernmost Phoenician text found in Syria.

It is currently located in the Vorderasiatisches Museum Berlin.

== Description of the stele ==
The stele is a 16-line text in the Phoenician language and written in an Old Aramaic form of the Phoenician alphabet.

According to William F. Albright, in its script, it resembles very closely the Mesha Stele that is very important in biblical archaeology.

King Kilamuwa is shown standing on the upper left and addressing four Mesopotamian gods with his right arm and finger, where he imitates his Mesopotamian lords in a gesture called "Ubanu tarrashu" which designates "you are my god". His left hand is draped at his left side holding a wilted lotus flower, a symbol of a king's death. He is dressed in king's regalia with hat, and his figure stands at the beginning of the first nine lines of the text.

== Transcription ==
The transcription in square script:

אנך. כלמו. בר. חי[א]
מלך. גבר. על. יאדי. ובל. פ[על]
כן בנה . ובל. פעל. וכן. אב. חיא. ובל. פעל. וכן. אח
שאל. ובל. פעל. ואנ[ך]. כלמו. בר. תמל. מאש. פעלת
בל. פעל. הלפניהם. כן. בת אבי. במתכת. מלכם. אד
רם. וכל. שלח. יד לל[ח]ם. וכת. ביד. מלכם כם אש. אכלת
זקן. ו[כם.] אש. אכלת. יד. ואדר עלי חלך. ד[נ]נים. ושכר
אנך. עלי. מלך אשר. ועלמת. יתן. בש. וגבר. בסות.

אנך. כלמו. בר חיא. ישבת. על. כסא. אבי. לפן. הם
לכם. הלפנים. יתלנן. משכבם. כם. כלבם. ואנך. למי. כת. אב. ולמי. כת. אם
ולמי. כת. אח. ומי. בל חז. פן. ש. שתי. בעל. עדר. ומי. בל חז. פן. אלף. שתי. בעל
בקר. ובעל. כסף. ובעל. חרץ. ומי. בל. חז. כתן. למנערי. ובימי. כסי. ב
ץ. ואנך. תמכת. משכבם. ליד. והמת. שת. נבש. כם. נבש יתם. באם. ומי. בבנ
י אש. ישב. תחתן. ויזק. בספר ז. משכבם. אל יכבד. לבעררם. ובערר
ם. אל יכבד. למשכבם ומי. ישחת. הספר ז. ישחת. ראש. בעל. צמד. אש. לגבר
וישחת. ראש. בעל חמן. אש. לבמה. ורכבאל. בעל בת.

== Translation ==
The translation of the stele:

"I am Kilamuwa, the son of King Chaya.
King Gabar reigned over Ya'diya but achieved nothing.
Then came Bamah, and he achieved nothing. Then there was my father Chaya, but he accomplished nothing. Then there was my brother
Sha'il, but he also accomplished nothing. But I Kilamuwa, the son of TML, what I accomplished
not (even) their predecessors accomplished. My father’s house was in the midst of powerful kings,
and each put forth his hand to eat it; but I was in the hand(s) of the kings like a fire that consumes
the beard or like a fire that consumes the hand. The king of the Danunians overpowered me, but I
hired against him the king of Assyria. He gave me a maid for the price of a sheep, and a man for the price of a garment.

I, Kilamuwa, the son of Chaya, sat upon my father’s throne. In face of the former
kings the MSHKBM used to whimper like dogs. But I – to some I was a father, and to some I was a mother,
and to some I was a brother. Him who had never seen the face of a sheep I made owner of a flock; him who had never seen the face of an ox, I made owner
of a herd, and owner of silver and owner of gold; and him who had never seen linen from his youth, in my days they covered
with byssus. I grasped the MSHKBM by the hand, and they behaved (towards me) like an orphan towards (his) mother. Now, if any of my sons.
who shall sit in my place does harm to this inscription, may the MSHKBM not honour the B’RRM, not the B’RRM"
honour the MSHKBM! And if anyone smashes this inscription, may Baal-Tzemed who belongs to Gabar smash his head,
and may Baal-Hammon who belongs to BMH and Rakkabel, lord of the dynasty, smash his head!

== Gallery ==
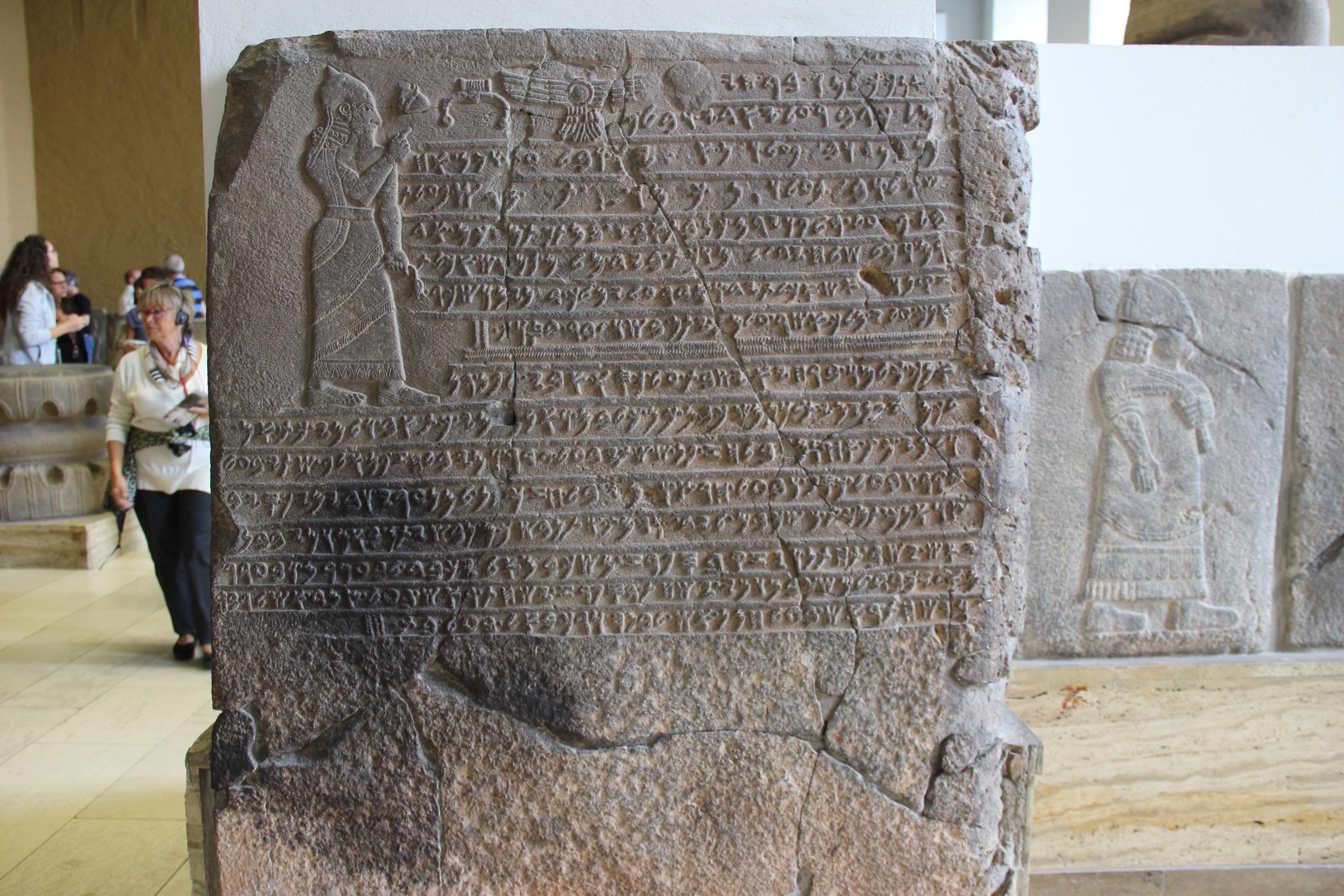
Stele of Prince Kilamuwa at the Pergamon Museum, Berlin

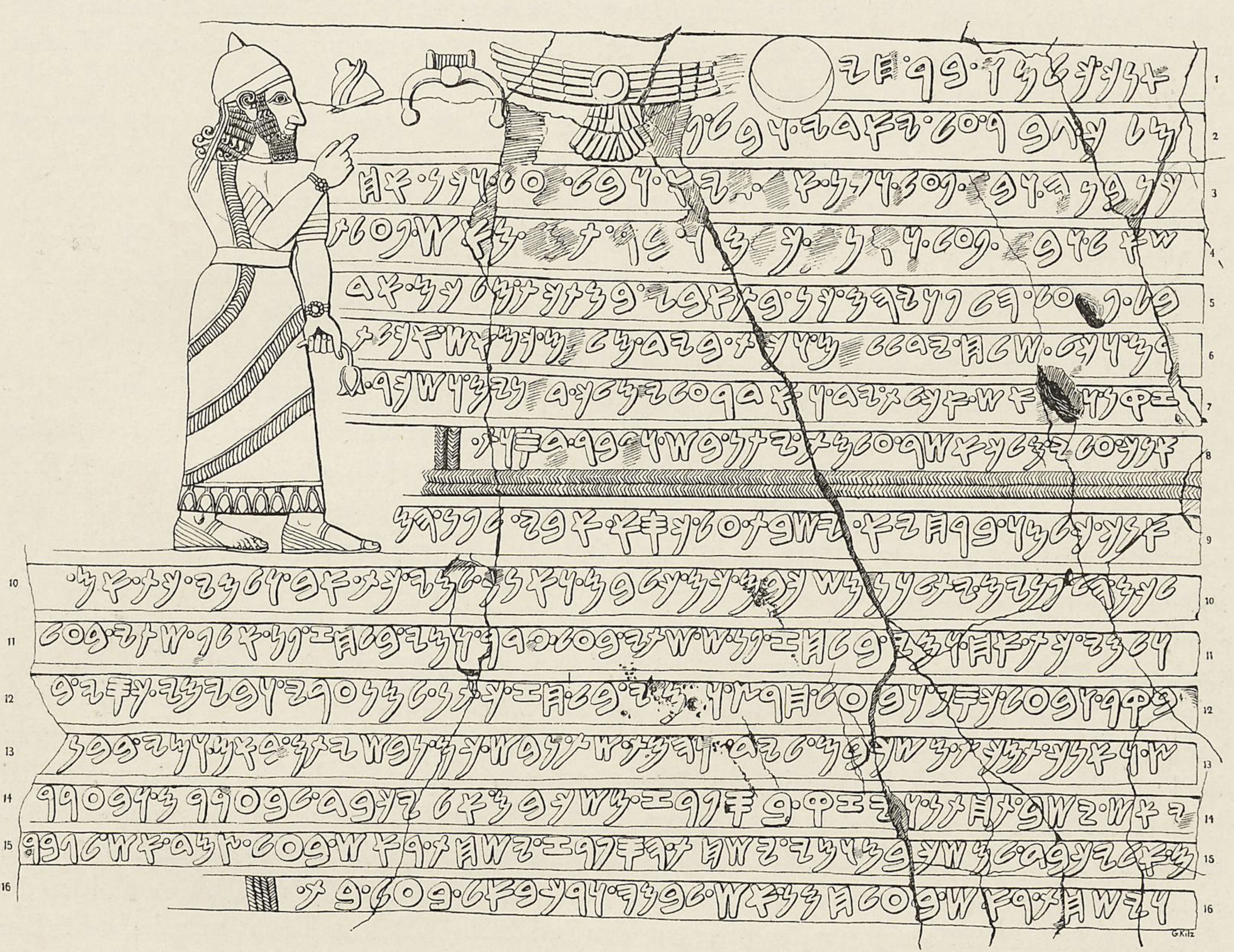
Kilamuwa Stele sketch

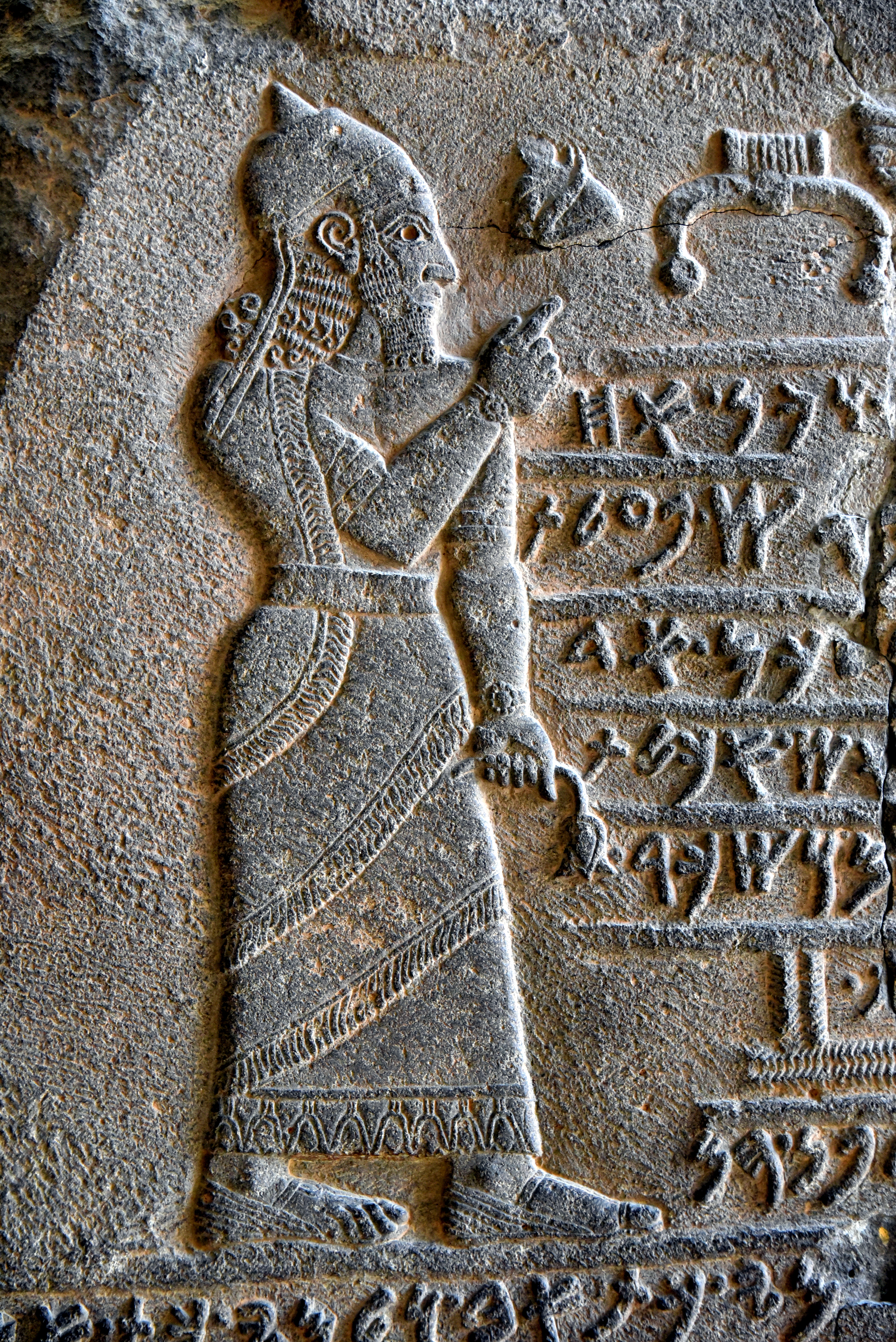
The Aramean king Kilamuwa on his stele from Bit Gabbari, 825 BCE

== Bibliography ==
- Halévy, J., "L'inscription du roi Kalumu." JA ser. 10, vol. 19 (1912a): 408–10.
- Kerrigan, 2009. The Ancients in Their Own Words, Michael Kerrigan, Fall River Press, Amber Books Ltd, c 2009. (hardcover. ISBN 978-1-4351-0724-3)
