= Yatar-Ami =

King of Carchemish
- Reign: c. 1765 – c. 1764 BC
- Predecessor: Aplahanda
- Successor: Yahdul-Lim
- Died: c. 1764 BC
- Father: Aplahanda

Yatar-Ami (died c. 1764 BC) was a king of Carchemish proposed to have reigned between 1765 and 1764 BC.

Son of Aplahanda, he enjoyed a brief reign of only two years before being succeeded by his brother, Yahdul-Lim. He is known to have continued the profitable lumber trade with Mari.

Preceded by Aplahanda	King of Carchemish c. 1765 – c. 1764 BC	Succeeded by Yahdul-Lim
