= House of Astiruwa =

Neo-Hittite dynasty from Carchemish

The House of Astiruwa was the last known dynasty of rulers of Carchemish. The members of this dynasty are best known to us through Hieroglyphic Luwian sources. One member of the House of Astiruwa may also be referred to in Assyrian sources.

== Astiruwa ==
Astiruwa, also Astiru, was the first known ruler of the dynasty named after him. Bearing the titles of country-lord, hero, and king, he ruled at the end of the 9th and the beginning of the 8th century BC, possibly between 848 and 790 BC. It is not known if he had any predecessors from the same dynastic line, but it is known that two or more unknown kings of some dynastic line occupied the throne of Carchemish between him and the last known preceding ruler of Carchemish, Sangara (last mentioned in Assyrian sources in 848 BC). King Astiruwa is not known from his own inscriptions but is mentioned in inscriptions of his successors or servants. The only fact known about his time of rule is that he built craft houses. Before his death, Astiruwa chose his immediate successor Yariri as regent for his underage son Kamani and his brothers.

== Yariri ==
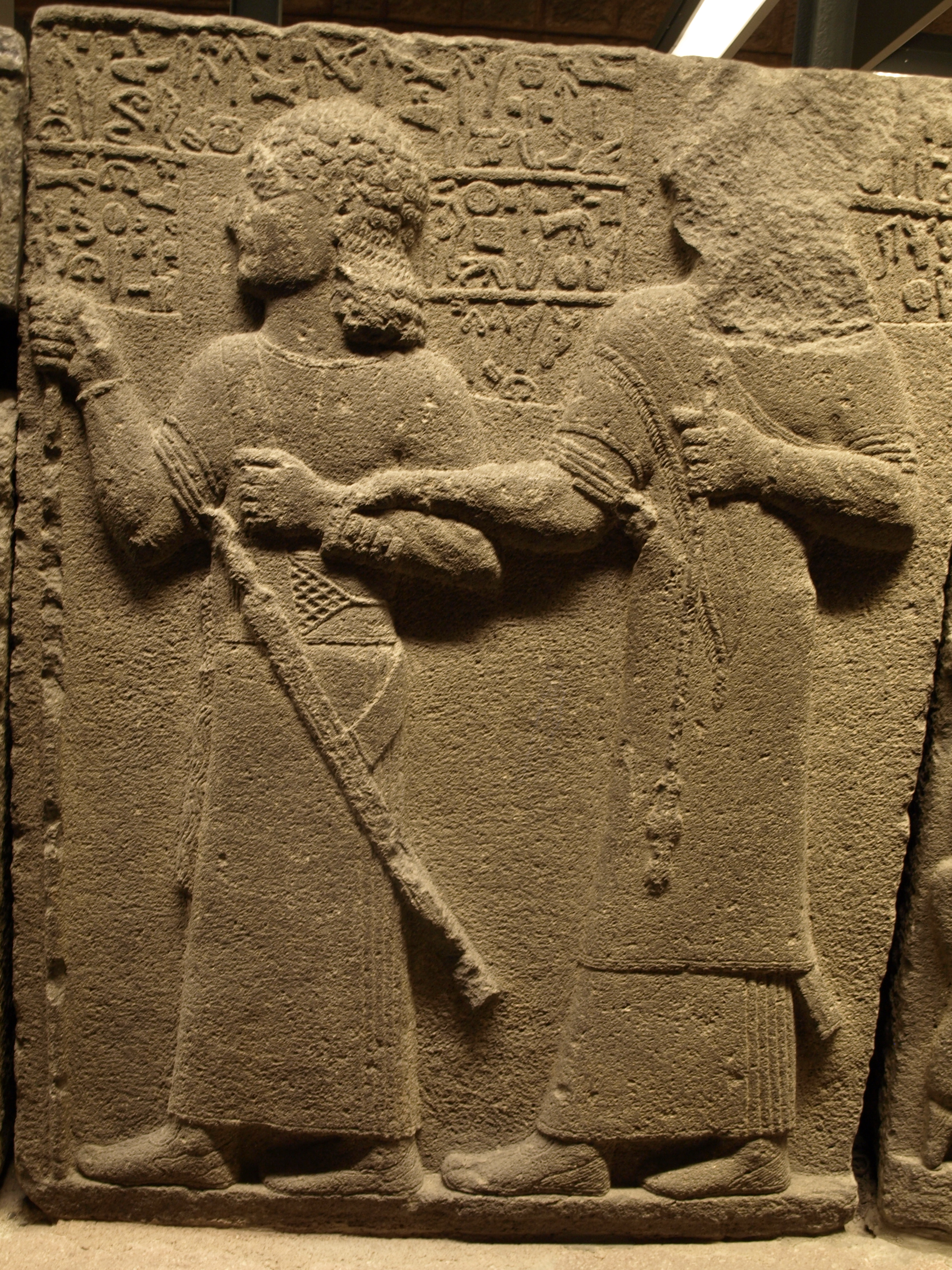
The regent Yariri (r.) and his successor Kamani (l.), the son of Astiruwa, on a relief from Carchemish

Yariri was the next known ruler of the House of Astiruwa. He bore the titles of ruler and prince and reigned in the early to mid 8th century BC, probably around 790 BC. Appointed as a regent for the underage children of his deceased lord Astiruwa, Yariri had apparently also held an earlier important position, possibly as the king's vizier or at least as close confidant and advisor to the king.

To be able to fulfill his obligations in these positions, Yariri got an excellent education on orders from the king. He spoke twelve languages and was able to write four different scripts,

- the writing of the city = Luwian hieroglyphs,
- the writing of Sura or Zura (possibly referring to the Urartian (Sura) or the Phoenician script of Tyre (Zura)
- the Assyrian script and
- the writing of the Taimani = Aramaean script.

=== Diplomatic contacts ===
During his regency, Yariri had numerous diplomatic contacts with,

- Mizra (Egypt),
- Musa (Lydians),
- Muska (Phrygians),
- Sura - possibly Urartu in the north, Phoenicia, or Tabal
- 475-la (reading unclear) Babylonia, or Urartu
- possibly also with Assyria.

During Yariri's regency, for which he may have been specially suited by being a eunuch, the situation of Carchemish was peaceful, stable and prosperous, Carchemish likely standing in good and close contact with Assyria.

Art reached high levels of cultural sophistication and Yariri signed responsible for several building projects and irrigation works.

== Kamani ==
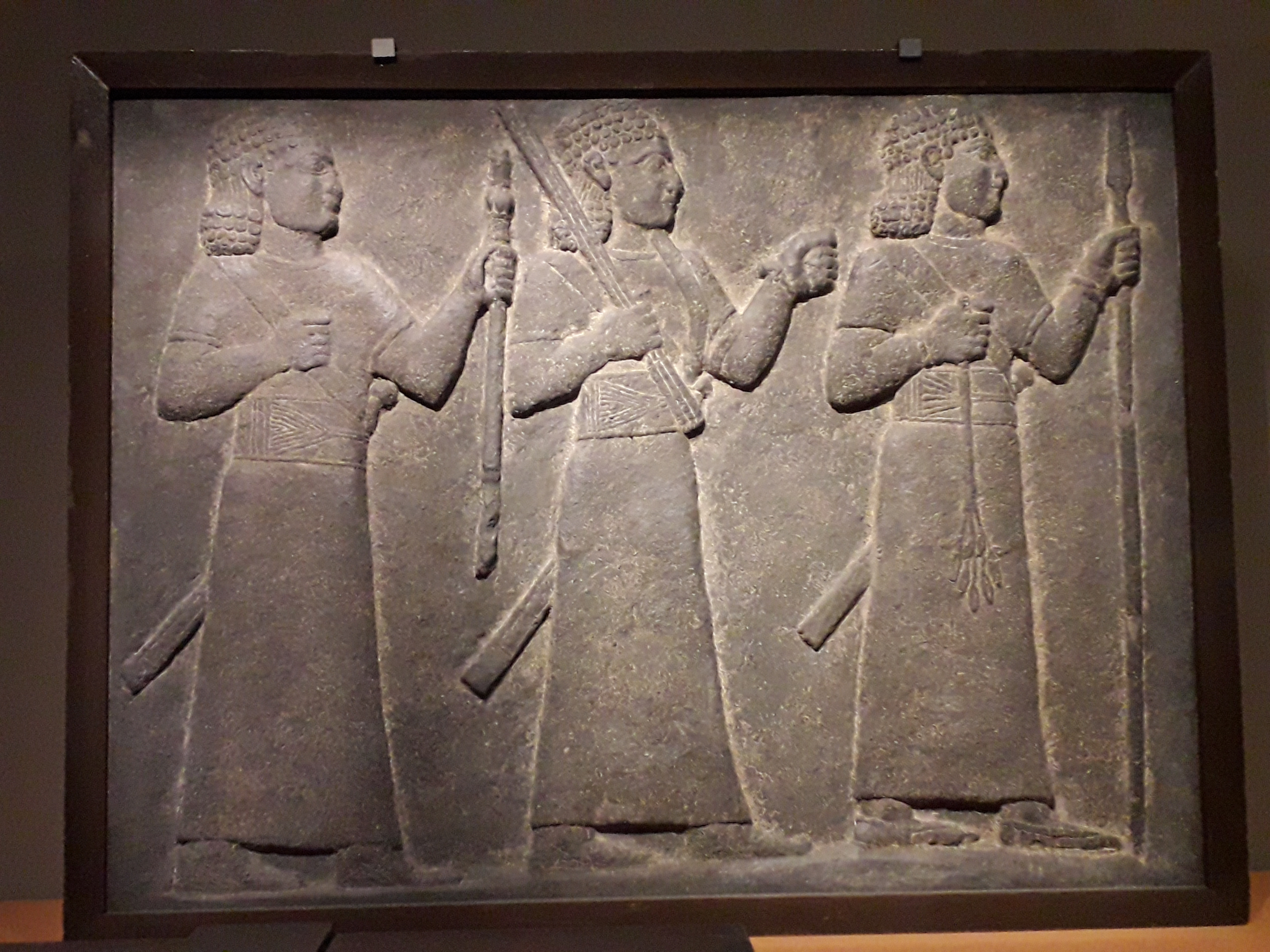
A cast from an orthostat from Carchemish depicting soldiers carrying weapons. A ceremony for Kamani, heir to the throne of Karkemish, and his brothers, in a style inspired by older reliefs at the Royal Buttress. British Museum

Successor of Yariri was Kamani, a son of Astiruwa. He bore the titles of ruler and country-lord, ruling in the early to mid 8th century BC, likely around 760 BC. During his reign, Carchemish continued to be peaceful and stable. Kamani had several building projects, undertook a military conquest and resettled devastated areas. He founded and populated a city named Kamana on a territory bought from a city named Kanapu and he was also involved in land sales.

== Sastura ==
Sastura was the vizier of Kamani. It is not known if he became king but his son is attested as ruler of Carchemish. Sastura ruled in the mid 8th century BC. The fact that Sastura or his son succeeded Kamani may be explained by a family relationship to the house of Aštiruwa. Sastura may have been a nephew, son-in-law or adopted son of Kamani, but nothing concrete is known.

== The son of Sastura ==
The son of Sastura was king of Carchemish in the 2nd half of the 8th century BC, bearing the titles hero and country-lord. His name is not preserved but it may be that he is an Astiru II who can be hypothetically reconstructed from a very fragmentary text. Otherwise he might be the ruler of Carchemish named Pisiri in Assyrian sources. If he indeed is not identical with the Assyrian Pisiri, the son of Sastura could be a predecessor of Pisiri, possibly the immediate one.

== Pisiri ==
Pisiri, the last king of Carchemish, is only mentioned in Assyrian sources for the years 738 and 717 BC. He may or may not be identical with the son of Šaštura named in Hieroglyphic Luwian inscriptions. In 738 BC Pisiri was tributary to the Assyrian king Tiglath-Pileser III. In 717 BC Pisiri searched contact to Mita, king of Muški (Midas, king of Phrygia). The Assyrian king Sargon II suspected a conspiracy by Pisiri and reacted by attacking the kingdom of Carchemish, capturing and plundering the capital of the same name. Sargon deported Pisiri, the former's family, the courtiers and the city's inhabitants to Assyria. Pisiri's cavalry, chariotry and infantry met the fate of being incorporated into the Assyrian army. Carchemish itself was repopulated with Assyrian settlers and was turned into an Assyrian province.

Preceded by House of Suhi	Dynasty of Kings of Carchemish ending 9th century - 717 BC	Succeeded by -
