= Bit Adini =

Former country

- c. 1000 BC–856-5 BC
- Bit Adini shown in the center along the Euphrates
- Capital: Til Barsip
- Common languages: Aramaic
- Religion: Ancient Levantine Religion
- Historical era: Iron Age
  - Established: c. 1000 BC
  - Disestablished: 856-5 BC
Succeeded by
Neo-Assyrian Empire
- Today part of: Syria

Bit Adini, a city or region of Syria, called sometimes Bit Adini in Assyrian sources, was an Aramaean state that existed as an independent kingdom during the 10th and 9th centuries BC, with its capital at Til Barsib (now Tell Ahmar). The city is considered one of the two chief states of the Aramean-held territories in the Euphrates along with Carchemish.

It is considered an Early Iron Age Aramaean settlement between the Balikh and the Euphrates rivers, and extended westwards into northern Syria. Some sources also refer to it as a Neo-Hittite kingdom due to the discovery of Hittite hieroglyphic inscriptions. It is usually thought to have been in the bend of the Euphrates River, south of Carchemish.

There are scholars who associate Bit Adini with Beth Eden, which may mean "house of evil" or "house of delight".

== History ==
Bit Adini was ruled by a figure called Ahuni (also referred to as Akhuni) during the mid-ninth century BC and became part of a territory that included the Neo-Hittite city Masuwari, Asmu, Dabigu, Dummetu, Kaprabu, and La'la'ru. Bit Adini was mentioned in ancient inscriptions such as the case of the recorded claim of Adad-Nirari II (911-891) that he received a gift of "large female monkey and small female monkey" from the city. Bit Adini has also exerted some degree of power and influence based on its interactions with Assyria. For instance, Bit-Adini - together with Babylon - supported the unsuccessful rebellion under Assurnasirpal I's reign in the states of Suhu (Suru), Hindanu, and Laqe.

In 883, during Assurnasirpal II's rule, a figure from Bit Adini was brought in to rule the Assyrian province of Bit-Halupe after a rebellion and the killing of its governor. An account described how the Assyrians attacked Bit Adini by crossing the Calah region between the Tigris and Euphrates. Later, in 853 BCE, Aḫuni joined a broader coalition of Levantine states at the Battle of Qarqar, inflicting enough casualties to force Shalmaneser III to campaign again but not to halt Assyrian expansion. Ahuni, the then ruler of the kingdom, submitted and gave tribute.

In 856-5 BC, the kingdom was conquered and absorbed into the Assyrian Empire during the reign of Shalmaneser III.

== See also ==
- Arameans
- Aram (region)
- Aramean kings
- Aramaic language
- Aramaic alphabet
- Aramaic studies

== Sources ==
- Bryce, Trevor R. (2012). The World of The Neo-Hittite Kingdoms: A Political and Military History. New York: Oxford University Press. ISBN 978-0-19-150502-7.
- Gzella, Holger (2015). A Cultural History of Aramaic: From the Beginnings to the Advent of Islam. Leiden-Boston: Brill. ISBN 9789004285101.
- Lipiński, Edward (2000). The Aramaeans: Their Ancient History, Culture, Religion. Leuven: Peeters Publishers. ISBN 9789042908598.
- Sader, Hélène (2010). "The Aramaeans of Syria: Some Considerations on their Origin and Material Culture". The Books of Kings: Sources, Composition, Historiography and Reception. Leiden-Boston: Brill. pp. 273–300. ISBN 978-9004177291.
- Younger, Kenneth Lawson (2016). A Political History of the Arameans: From Their Origins to the End of Their Polities. Atlanta: SBL Press. ISBN 9781628370843.
