= Carchemish =

Ancient city in Syria

Viceroyalty of Carchemish / Kingdom of Carchemish Karkamiša
- c. 1321 BC–717 BC
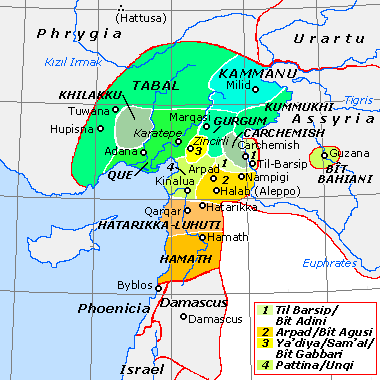
- Carchemish among the Neo-Hittite states
- Capital: Carchemish; 36°49′46″N 38°00′59″E
- Common languages: Hittite, Hieroglyphic Luwian
- Religion: Hittite-Luwian religion
- Government: Monarchy
- Historical era: Bronze Age, Iron Age
  - Established: c. 1321 BC
  - Disestablished: 717 BC
Preceded by	Succeeded by
Mitanni; Hittites	Neo-Assyrian Empire
- Today part of: Turkey; Syria

Carchemish (/ˈkɑːrkəmɪʃ/ KAR-kəm-ish or /kɑːrˈkiːmɪʃ/ kar-KEE-mish), also spelled Karkemish (Turkish: Karkamış), (Note: Hittite: 𒆳𒌷𒋼𒀀𒂵𒈩, romanized: Kargamiš; Hieroglyphic Luwian: 𔕢𔗧𔖻𔑺, romanized: Karkamis, 𔕢𔗧𔖻𔑷𔔂, Karkamis; Neo-Assyrian Akkadian: 𒌷𒃻𒂵𒈩, romanized: Gargamiš; Ancient Egyptian: 𓈎𓄿𓂋𓐰𓏭𓈎𓄿𓐛𓐰𓏭𓐰𓂝𓆷𓄿𓌙𓈉, romanized: qꜣrjqꜣmjꜥšꜣ;ꜣ Hebrew: כַּרְכְּמִישׁ, romanized: Ḵarkəmîš) was an important ancient capital in the northern part of the region of Syria. At times during its history the city was independent, but it was also part of the Mitanni, Hittite and Neo-Assyrian Empires. In Roman times the city bore the name Europus. Today it is on the frontier between Turkey and Syria.

It was the location of an important battle, about 605 BC, between the Babylonians and Egyptians, mentioned in the Bible (Jer. 46:2, 2 Chron. 35:20). Modern neighbouring cities are Karkamış in Turkey and Jarabulus in Syria (also Djerablus, Jerablus, Jarablos, Jarâblos).

== Geography of the site ==
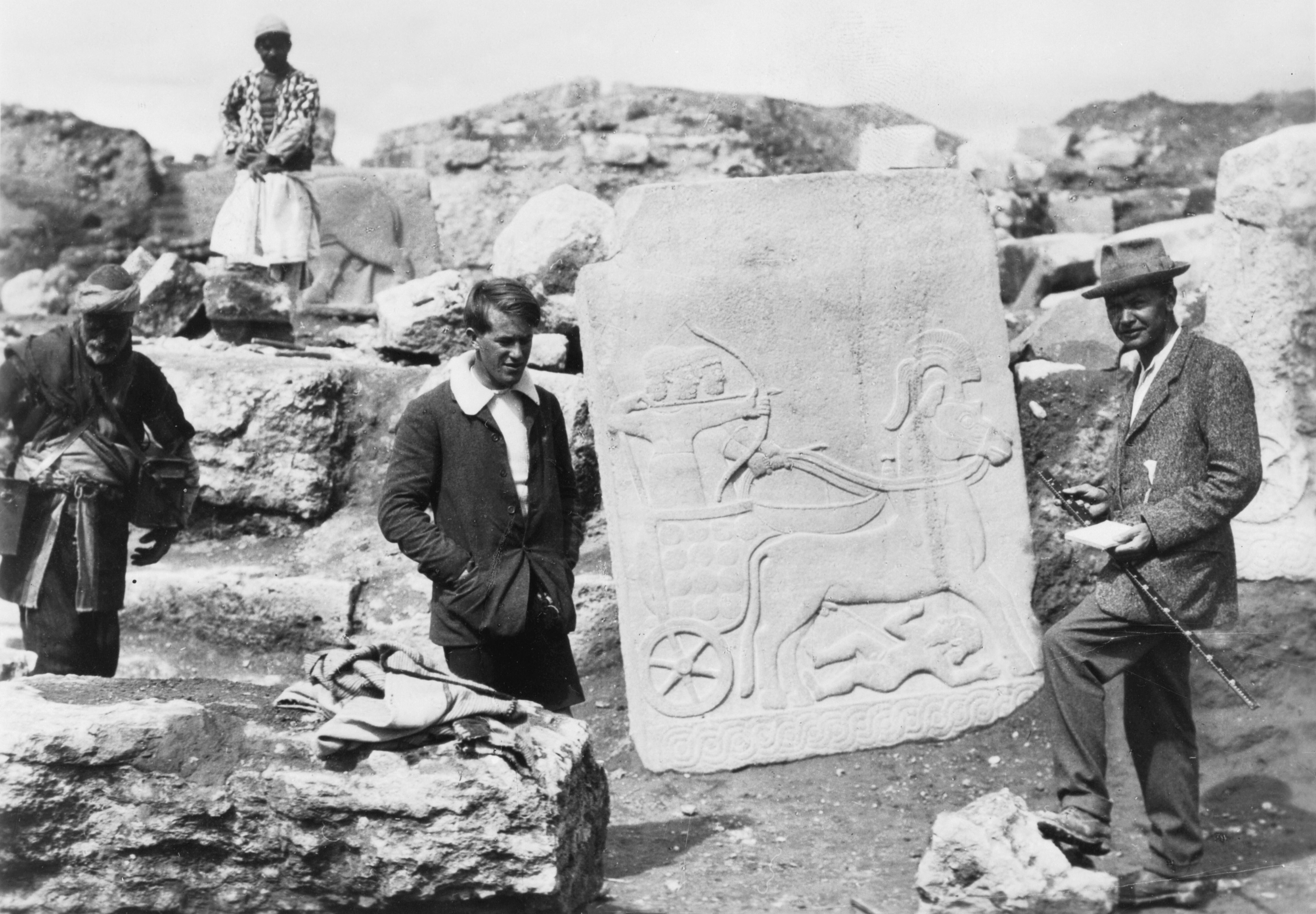
Early Hittite carving found by T. E. Lawrence and Leonard Woolley (right) in Carchemish

Carchemish is now an extensive set of ruins (90 hectares, of which 55 lie in Turkey and 35 in Syria), located on the West bank of the Euphrates River, about 60 kilometres (37 mi) southeast of Gaziantep, Turkey, and 100 kilometres (62 mi) northeast of Aleppo, Syria. The site is crossed by the Berlin–Baghdad railway that currently forms the border between Turkey and Syria. The site includes an acropolis along the river, an Inner Town encircled by earthen ramparts and an Outer Town (most of which is situated in Syrian territory). A Turkish military base has been established at the site.

== History of research ==
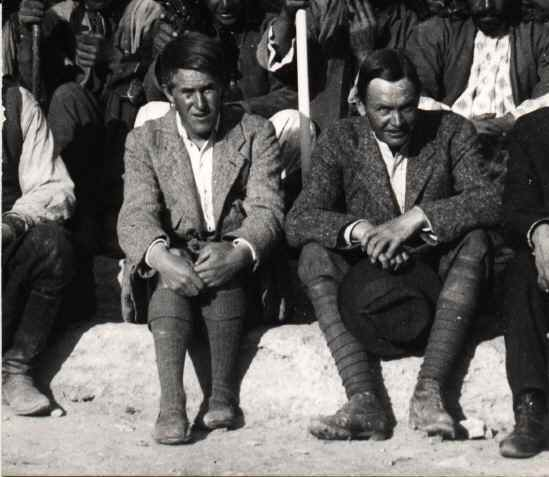
T. E. Lawrence and Leonard Woolley (right) in Carchemish, Spring 1913

Carchemish has always been well known to scholars because of several references to it in the Bible (Jer. 46:2; 2 Chr. 35:20; Isa. 10:9) and in Egyptian and Assyrian texts. In 1874, James H. Skene, British Consul at Aleppo proposed its identification. This was confirmed in 1876 by George Smith. Carchemish had been previously identified, incorrectly, with the Classical city of Circesium, at the confluence of the Khabur River and the Euphrates.

Between 1878 and 1881 soundings were conducted by Consul Patrick Henderson on behalf of the British Museum. Between 1911 and 1914 full excavations were conducted under the direction of D. G. Hogarth. In 1911 on the field there were D. G. Hogarth himself, R. C. Thompson, and T. E. Lawrence ("Lawrence of Arabia"), from 1912 to 1914 C. L. Woolley and T. E. Lawrence, while a last campaign took place in 1920 with C. L. Woolley and Philip Langstaffe Ord Guy. Excavations were interrupted in 1914 by World War I and then ended in 1920 with the Turkish War of Independence. These expeditions uncovered substantial remains of the Assyrian and Neo-Hittite periods, including defensive structures, temples, palaces, and numerous basalt statues and reliefs with Luwian hieroglyphic inscriptions. Between 1956 and 1998, the whole site had been mined by the Turkish Land Forces.

With the completion in February 2011 of mine clearing operations on the Turkish portion of the site, archaeological work was resumed in September 2011. Excavations in the Inner and Outer Towns were carried out by a joint Turco-Italian team from the Universities of Bologna, Gaziantep, and University of Istanbul under the direction of Prof. Dr. Nicolò Marchetti.

The second season, from August to November 2012, brought several new art findings and archaeological discoveries, the most remarkable of which is Katuwa's Palace (c. 900 BC) to the east of the Processional Entry.

The third season, from May to October 2013, extended the exposure of Katuwa's palace, retrieving a cuneiform tablet with an exorcism in the name of the god Marduk, as well as the ruins of Lawrence's excavation house in the Inner Town, from which literally hundreds of fragments of sculptures and hieroglyphic inscriptions have been retrieved.

The fourth season started in May 2014 and continued through October 2014: in Katuwa's palace several orthostats exquisitely carved with a procession of gazelle-bearers have been found, some of them in situ, next to a courtyard paved with squared slabs. In the Neo-Assyrian period that courtyard was covered by a mosaic floor made of river pebbles forming squares alternating in black and white color. Lawrence's excavation house was completely excavated.

During the fifth season, April to October 2015, more significant discoveries have been made in the palace area, both for Late Hittite sculptures, and Neo-Assyrian refurbishments, with tens of items—including two fragments of clay prismatical cylinders inscribed with a unique cuneiform text by Sargon, intended for display, telling how he captured and reorganized the city of Karkemish—retrieved in a 14-m-deep well, sealed in 605 BC at the time of the Late Babylonian takeover.

The sixth season, May to July 2016, saw a number of excavation areas opened also near the border, due to the added security represented by the construction of the wall (see below). Thus, in 2016 a complete stratigraphic record was obtained also for peripheral areas, greatly adding to our understanding of urban development between LB II and the Achaemenid period.

In the seventh season, from 7 May to 18 July 2017, the major breakthroughs were the beginning of the excavations on the north-western end of the acropolis and the discovery in the eastern Lower Palace area of a monumental building dating from the LB II. Among the finds, in addition to new sculpted complete artworks from the Iron Age, fragments of Imperial Hittite clay cuneiform tablets and c. 250 inscribed bullae should be mentioned.

The eighth season lasted from 4 May to 20 July 2019 and revealed a massive palace on the top of the acropolis dating from Late Bronze II, exposed more architecture and finds from the LB II administrative building in area C East (which seems to be the Hittite E2.KIŠIB) and more of the Iron I storage facility in area S.

Archaeological investigations on the Syrian side have been conducted as part of the Land of Carchemish project: investigations of the Outer Town of Carchemish were undertaken in conjunction with the DGAM in Damascus and with the funding and sponsorship of the Council for British Research in the Levant and of the British Academy, under the direction of the late Professors T. J. Wilkinson and E. Peltenburg.

== Current status ==
Conservation and presentation works have now been completed and the archaeological park at the site is finally open since 13 July 2019, thanks to the support also of Gaziantep Metropolitan Municipality and Gaziantep Province: the site may be visited between 9 am and one hour before sunset through guided tours every two hours for security reasons. Financial support has been received by the three Universities mentioned above, by the Italian Ministry of Foreign Affairs, and the Sanko Holding, with the technical support also of Şahinbey Municipality and Inta A.Ş.

The Outer Town area lying in Syria has been designated, already before the Syrian Civil War, an endangered cultural heritage site and labelled "at risk" by the Global Heritage Fund, due to agricultural expansion and, especially, urban encroachment. The field assessment of the Syrian part of the Outer Town documented that parts of the modern border town of Jerablus encroached upon the Outer Town. In July 2019, a scientific visit to the outer town in Syria by the Turco-Italian Archaeological Expedition at Karkemish, entailed the protection of the area from further encroachment by the sprawling town of Jerablus and by the facilities for trucks which were being built to the South of the border: the City Council of Jerablus declared all the area enclosed by the Iron Age city walls a "first degree protected site", meaning the complete ban of any activity on it.

In February 2016, a prefabricated security wall (one with no foundations that could have damaged the ancient site) was completed by the Turkish Army to the south of the railway, stretching between the Euphrates bridge and the train station of Karkamış.

== History ==
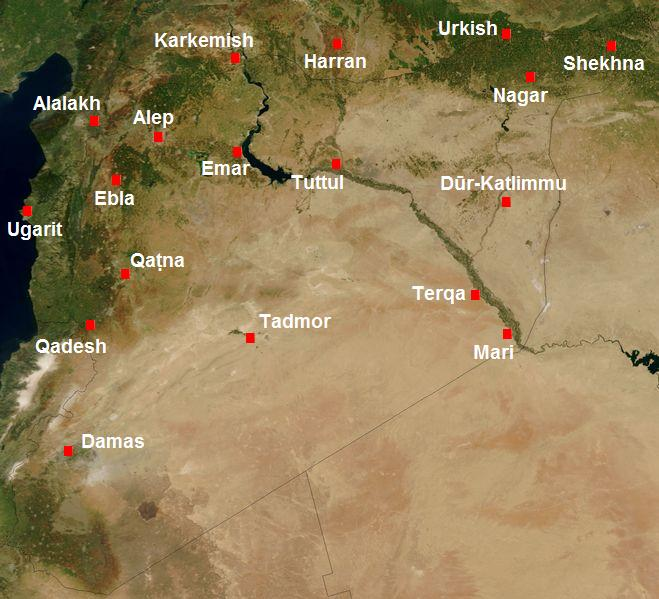
Map of Syria in the second millennium BC, showing the location of Carchemish, or "Karkemish."

The site has been occupied since the Neolithic and Chalcolithic periods (pot burials).

=== Early Bronze ===
==== Early Bronze IIIB ====
In the late Early Bronze, cist tombs dating to around 2400 BC have been found.

==== Early Bronze IVA ====
The city is mentioned in documents found in the Ebla archives of the 3rd millennium BC.

=== Middle Bronze ===
==== Middle Bronze IIA ====
According to documents from the archives of Mari and Alalakh, dated from c. 1770s-1760s BC and contemporary with king Zimri-Lim of Mari. Carchemish was ruled by a king named Aplahanda, followed by his son, Yatar-Ami, and was an important center of timber trade. It had treaty relationships with Ugarit and Mitanni (also known as Hanilgalbat). Another ruler of Carchemish in that period was Iahdun-Lim. In ancient times, the city commanded the main ford in the region across the Euphrates, a situation which must have contributed greatly to its historical and strategic importance. After about 1745 BC, and the reign of Yahdul-Lim, not much is further known about Carchemish.

==== Middle Bronze IIB ====
===== Hittite influence =====
Little is known until the 1620s, when the city is mentioned in connection with the siege of Urshu (Ursha) by the Hittite king Hattusili I. At that time, Carchemish was allied with the kingdom of Yamhad, centered in Aleppo, in supporting Urshu, but their efforts were unsuccessful, and the city fell, along with many other Syrian cities. Hattusili and his successor Mursili I campaigned several years against Yamhad. Also Hantili I conducted a campaign to Carchemish to face the Hurrians.

=== Late Bronze ===
==== Egyptian influence ====
Pharaoh Thutmose I of the Eighteenth Dynasty erected a stele near Carchemish to celebrate his conquest of Syria and other lands beyond the Euphrates.

==== Mitanni influence ====
Under the Mitanni Empire, the city was a stronghold of Tushratta of Mitanni until its siege and conquest by Šuppiluliuma I (c. 1345 BC).

==== Hittite influence ====
Around the end of the reign of Pharaoh Tutankhamen, Carchemish was captured by king Šuppiluliuma I of the Hittites (c. 14th century BC), who made it into a kingdom ruled by his son Piyassili.

Piyassili (Šarri-Kušuḫ) was followed by his son Shakhurunuwa (Sahurunuwa), about whom relatively little is known. He participated in the Battle of Kadesh (1274 BC). He was followed by Ini-Teššub.

=== Iron Age ===
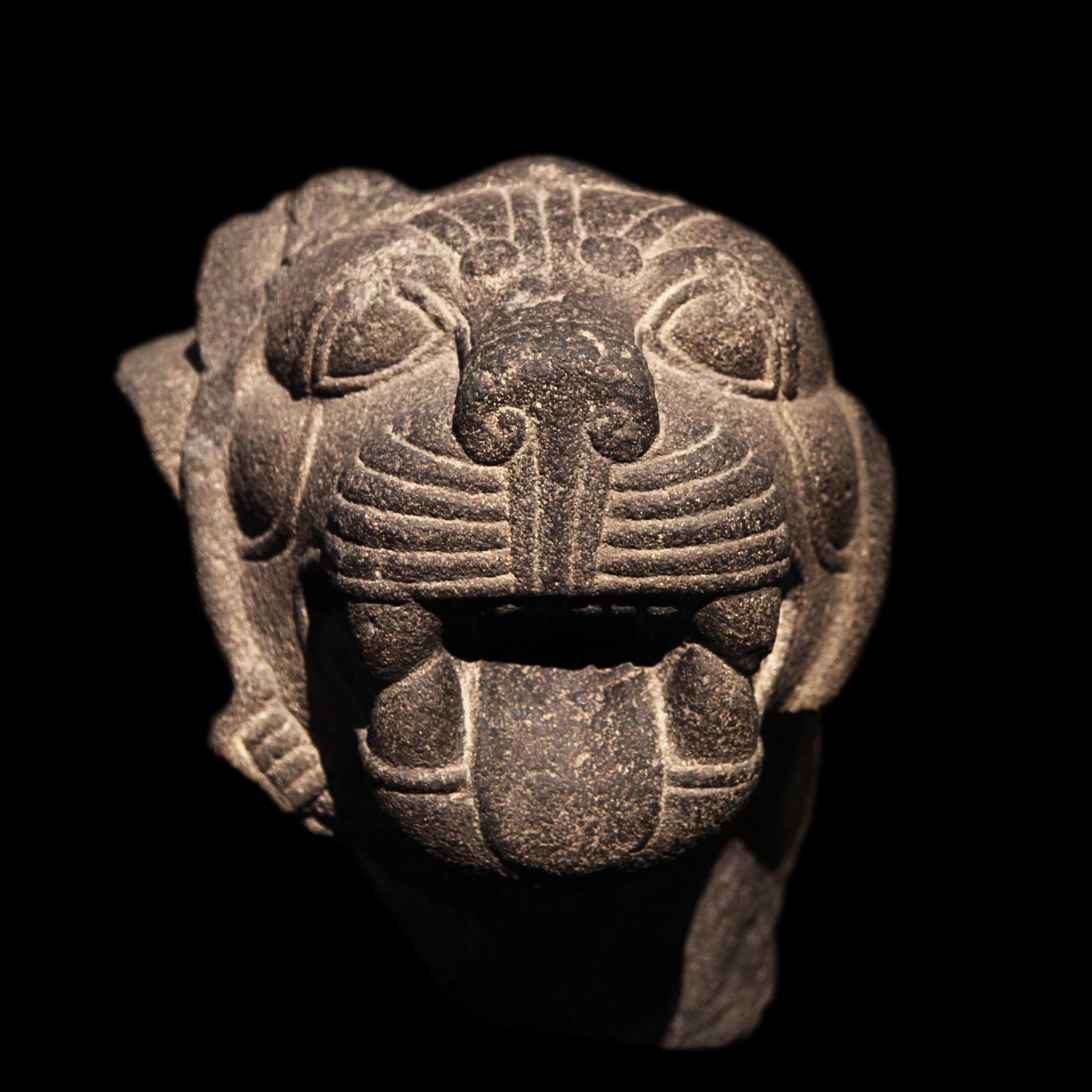
Basalt lion head from the monument to King Katuwa at Carchemish, now in the British Museum

The city became one of the most important centres in the Hittite Empire, during the Late Bronze Age, and reached its apogee around the 13th century BC. While the Hittite empire fell to the Sea Peoples during the Bronze Age collapse, Carchemish survived the Sea Peoples' attacks to continue to be the capital of an important Neo-Hittite kingdom in the Iron Age, and a trading center.

Although Ramesses III states in an inscription dating to his 8th Year from his Medinet Habu mortuary temple that Carchemish was destroyed by the Sea Peoples, the city evidently survived the onslaught.

==== Kuzi-Teshub I ====
King Kuzi-Teshub (Kuzi-Tesup) is attested in power here and was the son of Talmi-Teshub who was a contemporary of the last Hittite king, Šuppiluliuma II. He and his successors ruled a "mini-empire" stretching from Southeast Asia Minor to Northern Syria and the West bend of the Euphrates under the title "Great King". This suggests that Kuzi-Tesub saw himself as the true heir of the line of the great Šuppiluliuma I and that the central dynasty at Hattusa was now defunct. This powerful polity lasted from c. 1175 to 975 BC when it began losing control of its farther possessions and became gradually a more local city state centered around Carchemish.

After Kuzi-Teshub, some of the kings of Carchemish, such as Tuthaliya I, Sapaziti, and Ura-Tarhunza, continued to use the title ‘Great King’ in order to advance their power interests.

==== House of Suhi ====
Suhi I was the first known ruler of the dynasty of Carchemish that followed. He ruled in early 10th century BC, and was followed by Astuwalamanza.

Katuwa, son of Suhi II, is the best known ruler of this dynasty as known in the Hieroglyphic Luwian sources. He reigned around 880 BC.

==== Relations with Assyria ====
In the mid-13th century BC, after the fall of the Mitanni, Shalmaneser I visited Carchemish together with Prince Tukultī-Ninurta.

In the 9th century BC, King Sangara (870-848 BC), the last member of the dynasty, paid tribute to Kings Ashurnasirpal II and Shalmaneser III of Assyria.

Sangara already appeared in the Balawat Bronze Bands of Ashurnasirpal II as a tributary probably at some time before 868 BC. According to the archaeologist Shigeo Yamada, Karkamish may have been known during this period as 'Sazabê', “a fortified city of Sangara the Karkamishean”. Nevertheless, Sangara failed to leave any inscriptions at the city of Karkamish itself as far as is known. Still, in 2015 his name was identified in Hieroglyphic Luwian for the first time in a local inscription.

Following this period, Karkamish does not appear in Assyrian sources until the mid-8th century BC. The only exception was a brief mention by Samši-Adad V (824–811 BC). Nevertheless, only 20 km downstream the Euphrates river, at the city of Til-Barsip (modern Tell Ahmar), the Assyrians established an important provincial capital. They renamed their new city as 'Kar-Shalmaneser', yet the old name was also used.

==== Stele of Kubaba ====
In 2015, for the first time, the name of Sangara has been documented in a hieroglyphic Luwian inscription originally erected in Carchemish, itself. The six extant pieces of the basalt stele of the goddess Kubaba from Karkemish, currently housed in three different museums, have finally been all discovered and assembled together. This stele was made by king Kamani of Karkemish around 790 BC. The top part of this stele was drawn in 1876 by George Smith and transported in 1881 to the British Museum.

In 1876, this was the longest hieroglyphic Luwian inscription known until then. Based on it, Smith was the first to link the site with the Hittites as mentioned in the Bible, and also to identify it as Carchemish.

The House of Suhi are known for their extensive building program. They left a prominent set of monuments, with sculptures and inscriptions. Among the monuments they left, there are portal lions, inscriptions, relief orthostats and freestanding statues.

==== House of Astiruwa ====
The House of Astiruwa was the last known dynasty of rulers of Carchemish, and king Astiruwa (ca 848-790 BC) was the founder of this dynasty. Then came kings Yariri, Kamani, and Sastura.

King Yariri started to reign after 790 BC. He was a great scholar, and left extensive records of his time.

Carchemish was conquered by Sargon II in 717 BC in the reign of King Pisiri, the last ruler of the House of Astiruwa.

==== Battle of Carchemish ====
In the summer of 605 BC, the Battle of Carchemish was fought there by the Babylonian army of Nebuchadnezzar II and that of Pharaoh Necho II of Egypt and the remnants of the Assyrian army (Jer. 46:2). The aim of Necho's campaign was to contain the Westward advance of the Babylonian Empire and cut off its trade route across the Euphrates. However, the Egyptians were defeated by the unexpected attack of the Babylonians and were eventually expelled from Syria.

In 2013, the joint Turkish-Italian excavation team announced the discovery of a large inscribed limestone stele featuring a depiction of Nebuchadnezzar's face, as well as a cuneiform inscription with his name and titles. This may provide further details about Nebuchadnezzar's activities in Carchemish.

After a brief Neo-Babylonian occupation, the Turco-Italian excavations found evidence for three phases of Achaemenid occupation, a significant reconstruction in Hellenistic times, a monumental phase from the Late Roman period, an Early Byzantine and three Abbasid phases before the final abandonment of the site until the early 1900s.

== Kings of Carchemish ==
This is a list of kings of Carchemish.

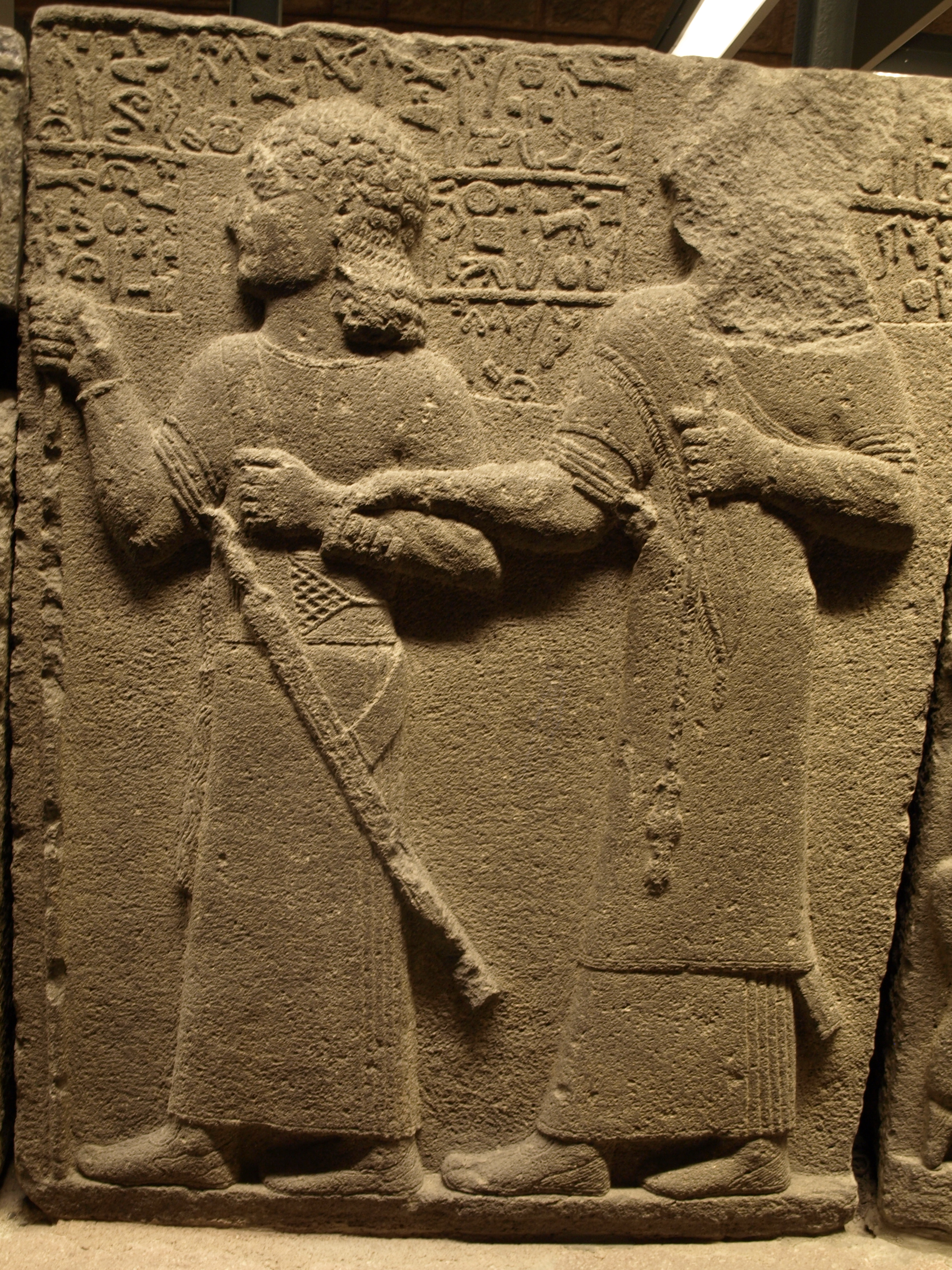
Yariri (r.) and Kamani (l.), resp. regent and future-ruler of Carchemish

Ruler	Proposed reign (BC)	Notes
Adni-anda (?)	c. ? to 1786	
Aplah-anda I	c. 1786 to 1764	son of Adni-anda
Yatar-Ami	c. 1764 to 1763	son of Aplah-anda I
Yahdun-Lim, or possibly Yahdul-Lim	c. 1763 to 1745?	son of Bin-Ami
Aplah-anda II	c. 1745? to ?	son of Yahdun-Lim?
Piyassili or Sharri-Kushukh	c. 1315	son of the Hittite king Šuppiluliuma I
[ ... ]sharruma		son of Piyassilis
Shakhurunuwa		son of Piyassilis
Ini-Teshub I	c. 1230s	
Talmi-Teshub	c. 1200	
Kuzi-Teshub	c. 1170	claimed the title of "Great King" after the fall of Hatti
Ini-Teshub II	c. 1100	
Tudhaliya	c. 1100	either before or after Ini-Teshub II
Sapaziti	c. 1025	
Uratarhunda	c. 1000	
Suhi I	c. 975	
Astuwalamanza	c. 950	
Suhi II	c. 925	
Katuwa	c. 900	
Suhi III	c. 890	
Sangara	c. 870–848	
Isarwilamuwa	c. 840	
Kuwalanamuwa	c. 835	
Astiru	c. 830	
Yariri (regent)	c. 815	
Kamani	c. 790	
Sastura	c. 760	
Astiru II	(?)	
Pisiri	c. 730s	the last king, defeated in 717 by Sargon II

== Goddess Kubaba ==
The patron goddess of Carchemish was Kubaba, a deity of apparently Hurrian origins. She was represented as a dignified woman wearing a long robe, standing or seated, and holding a mirror. The main male deity of the town was Karhuha, akin to the Hittite stag-god Kurunta.

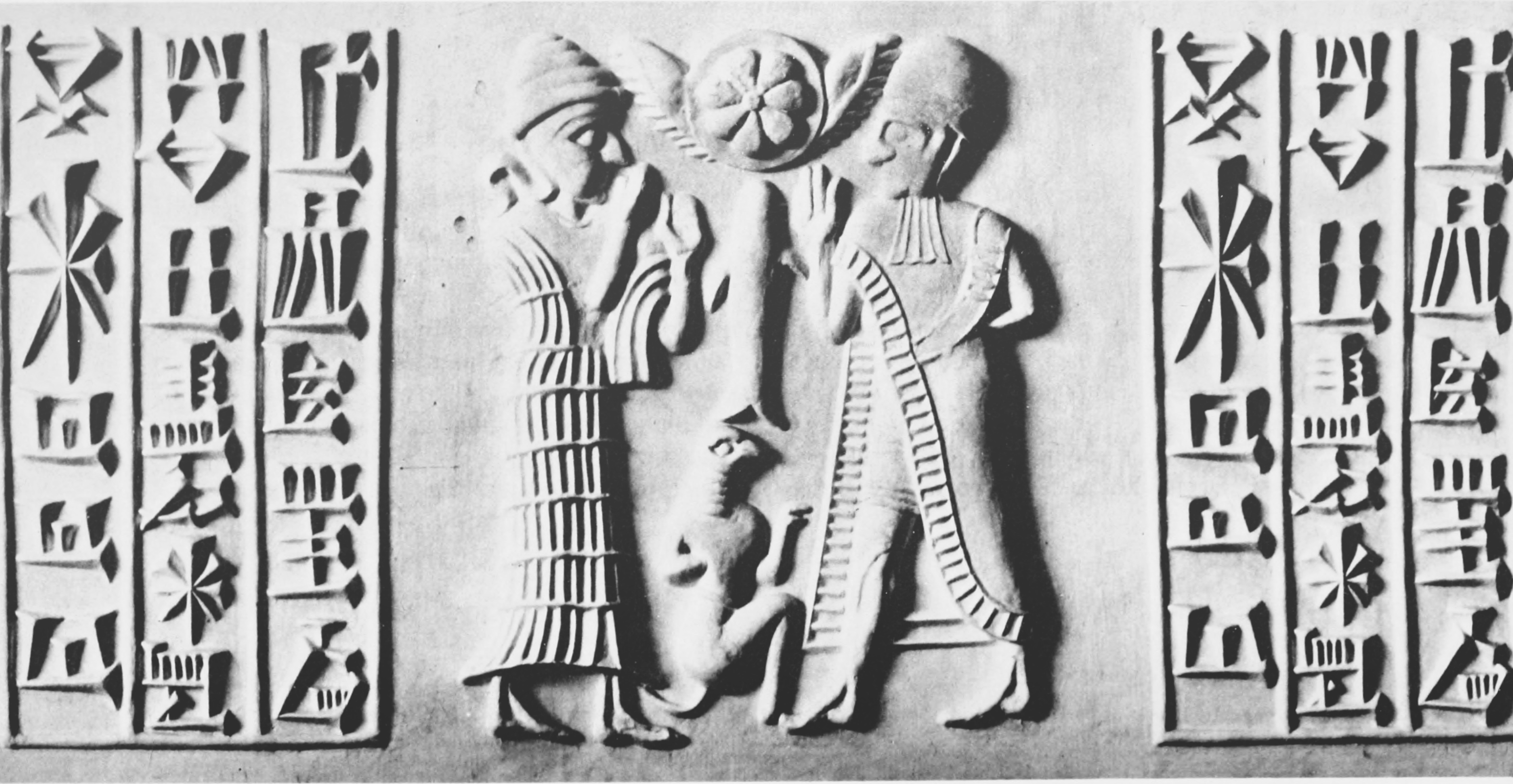
Old Syrian seal, dedicated to goddess Kubaba by Matrunna, daughter of Aplahanda, early 18th century BCE.

Kubaba was also the goddess of Alalakh, located in the coastal Amik Valley.

In 2015, a basalt stele of Kubaba, originally from Karkemish, was assembled back together from six separate broken pieces currently housed in three different museums around the world. This stele was originally made by king Kamani of Karkemish around 790 BC. The Luwian hieroglyphic inscription on this stele can now be read more fully, and it carries some important information about Karkemish history.

Kubaba appears to be one of the three main deities worshipped in Carchemish during the Middle Bronze Age. The other two were Nergal and Nubandag. The chief god was the Mesopotamian-influenced Nergal, who was the city-god of Carchemish. He was also called Il-Karkamis, “God of Karkemish”, as is evidenced on an Old Babylonian hematite cylinder seal in the British Museum collections (BM 89172).

The warrior god Nubandag has Hurrian roots. According to the Mari texts, he was worshipped at Carchemish in the Old Babylonian period along with Nergal.

Later, beginning in the mid-14th century BC, the city-god of Carchemish became the warrior god Karhuha, similar to Kurunta (god). He was seen as a Stag-god, and his cult was probably introduced to Carchemish under the Mitannian influence.

These deities clearly reflect the geographical position of Carchemish at the crossing of important trade routes; because of this, the city became a mixed cultural and religious centre.

== Material Culture ==
Among the many artefacts recovered at Karkemish, typical of this territory are the Handmade Syrian Horses and Riders and the Syrian Pillar Figurines. These are clay figurines dating from mid-8th-7th centuries BCE that have been found in several hundreds in the town. These terracottas were manufactured during the Neo-Assyrian phase of Karkemish and it is currently believed they might have represented male and female characters performing distinguished public roles.

== See also ==
- Cities of the ancient Near East
- Short chronology timeline
- Jerablus Tahtani
- Karkamış
- Carchemish Phoenician inscription

== Sources ==
BRITISH MUSEUM EXPEDITION

- Hogarth D.G., Carchemish I: Introductory, The British Museum Press, London 1914, repr. 1969.
- Woolley C.L., Carchemish II: Town Defences: Report on the Excavations at Jerablus on Behalf of the British Museum, British Museum Press, London 1921, repr. 1969, ISBN 0-7141-1002-7. Carchemish II
- Woolley C.L. & Barnett R.D., Carchemish III: Excavations in the Inner Town: Report on the Excavations at Jerablus on Behalf of the British Museum, British Museum Press, London 1952, repr. 1978, ISBN 0-7141-1003-5. Carchemish III

TURCO-ITALIAN EXPEDITION

- Bitelli G., Girardi F., Girelli V.A., Digital enhancement of the 3D scan of Suhi I's stele from Karkemish, in Orientalia 83/2 (2014), pp. 154–161.
- Bolognani B.,The Iron Age Figurines from Karkemish (2011–2015 Campaigns) and the Coroplastic Art of the Syro-Anatolian Region, unpublished doctoral dissertation, University of Bologna, Bologna (2017). amsdottorato.unibo.it/8222/7/Bolognani_Barbara_tesi.pdf
- Bolognani B., "The Iron Age Female Figurines from Karkemish and the Middle Euphrates Valley. Preliminary Notes on Some Syrian Pillar Figurines", in Donnat S., Hunziker-Rodewald R., Weygand I. (eds), Figurines féminines nues : Proche-Orient, Égypte, Nubie, Méditerranée, Asie centrale (VIIIe millénaire av. J.-C. - IVe siècle ap. J.-C.), Proceedings of the International Conference “Figurines féminines nues. Proche-Orient, Egypte, Nubie, Méditerranée, Asie centrale”, June 25th-26th 2015, MISHA, Strasbourg, Études d’archéologie et d’histoire ancienne (EAHA), De Boccard, Paris, pp. 209–223 (2020a). Bolognani 2020a
- Bolognani, B., "Figurines as Social Markers: The Neo-Assyrian Impact on the Northern Levant as Seen from the Material Culture", in Gavagnin K., Palermo R. (eds), Imperial Connections. Interactions and Expansions from Assyria to the Roman Period. Proceedings of the 5th “Broadening Horizons” Conference, 5–8 June 2017, Udine(West & East Monografie 2), University of Udine, Udine, pp. 43–57 (2020b).Bolognani 2020b
- Dinçol A., Dinçol B., Hawkins J.D., Marchetti N., Peker H., A Stele by Suhi I from Karkemish, in Orientalia 83/2 (2014), pp. 143–153.
- Dinçol A., Dinçol B., Peker H., An Anatolian Hieroglyphic Cylinder Seal from the Hilani at Karkemish, in Orientalia 83/2 (2014), pp. 162–165.
- Marchesi G., Epigraphic Materials of Karkemish from the Middle Bronze Age, in Orientalia 83/2 (2014), pp. 166–181.
- Marchesi G., A Bilingual Literary Text from Karmenish Featuring Marduk (with contributions by W.R. Mayer and S.V. Panayotov), in Orientalia 83/4 (2014), pp. 333–340.
- Marchetti N., "The 2011 Joint Turco-Italian Excavations at Karkemish", in 34. kazı sonuçları toplantısı, 28 Mayıs-1 Haziran 2012, Çorum. 1. cilt, T.C. Kültür ve Turizm Bakanlığı, Ankara (2013), pp. 349–364. kulturvarliklari.gov.tr/Eklenti/7332,34kazi1.pdf?0
- Marchetti N., The 2012 Joint Turco-Italian Excavations at Karkemish, in 35. kazı sonuçları toplantısı, 27–31 Mayıs 2013, Muğla. 3. cilt, T.C. Kültür ve Turizm Bakanlığı, Ankara (2014), pp. 233–248. kulturvarliklari.gov.tr/Eklenti/27148,35kazi3.pdf?0
- Marchetti N., Karkemish. An Ancient Capital on the Euphrates (OrientLab 2), Ante Quem, Bologna (2014). free download orientlab.net/pubs (free download)
- Marchetti N., Bronze Statuettes from the Temples of Karkemish, in Orientalia 83/3 (2014), pp. 305–320.
- Marchetti N., Karkemish. New Discoveries in the Last Hittite Capital, in Current World Archaeology 70 (2015), pp 18–24. world-archaeology.com/issue-70/cwa-70.htm
- Marchetti N., Les programmes publics de communication visuelle à Karkemish entre la fin du IIe millénaire et le début du Ier millénaire avant J.-C., in V. Blanchard (ed.), Royaumes oubliés. De l'Empire hittite aux Araméens, Louvre éditions, Paris, (2019), pp. 154–161.
- Marchetti N. et al., Karkemish on the Euphrates: Excavating a City's History, in Near Eastern Archaeology 75/3 (2012), pp. 132–147.jstor.org/stable/10.5615/neareastarch.75.issue-3
- Marchetti N., Peker H., A Stele from Gürçay near Karkemish, in Orientalia 83/2 (2014), pp. 182–188.
- Peker, Hasan, "A New Funerary Stele from Karkemish and New Values for Some Anatolian Hieroglyphic Signs", Belleten 87.309, pp. 357–383, 2023
- Peker H., A Funerary Stele from Yunus, in Orientalia 83/2 (2014), pp. 189–193.
- Peker H., Texts from Karkemish I. Luwian Hieroglyphic Inscriptions from the 2011-2015 Excavations (OrientLab Series Maior 1), Ante Quem, Bologna (2016).
- Pizzimenti S., Three Glyptic Documents from Karkemish, in Orientalia 83/2 (2014), pp. 194–201.
- Zaina F. (ed.), Excavations at Karkemish I. The Stratigraphic Sequence of Area G (OrientLab Series Maior 3), Ante Quem, Bologna, (2019).
- Zecchi M., A Note on Two Egyptian Seal Impressions from Karkemish, in Orientalia 83/2 (2014), pp. 202–206.

OTHER REFERENCES

- GüterbockH.G., Carchemish, in Journal of Near Eastern Studies 13/2 (1954), pp. 102–114.
- Hayes Ward W.M., Unpublished or Imperfectly Published Hittite Monuments. III. Reliefs at Carchemish=Jerablûs, The American Journal of Archaeology and of the History of the Fine Arts, vol. 4, pp. 172–174, (1988).*
- Hawkins J.D.,"Kargamiš.", Reallexikon der Assyriologie und Vorderasiatischen Archäologie, Walter de Gruyter, Berlin (1980).
- Hawkins J.D., Corpus of Hieroglyphic Luwian Inscriptions I. Inscriptions of the Iron Age. Walter de Gruyter, Berlin (2000), ISBN 978-3-11-010864-4.
- Hutter M., "Aspects of Luwian Religion", in H.C. Melchert (ed.), The Luwians, Brill, (2003).
- Marchesi, Gianni, "A Unique Late Hittite Monumental Cuneiform Inscription from Karkemish", ORIENTLAB, pp.44-45, 2026
- Peltenburg E., Euphrates River Valley Settlement: The Carchemish Sector in the Third Millennium BC, Oxbow Books, (2007).
- Wilson D.M., The British Museum. A history. The British Museum Press, London, 2002.
- Woolley, C. Leonard, "The Prehistoric Pottery of Carchemish", Iraq, vol. 1, no. 2, pp. 146–62, 1934
