= House of Suhi =

Neo-Hittite dynasty from Carchemish

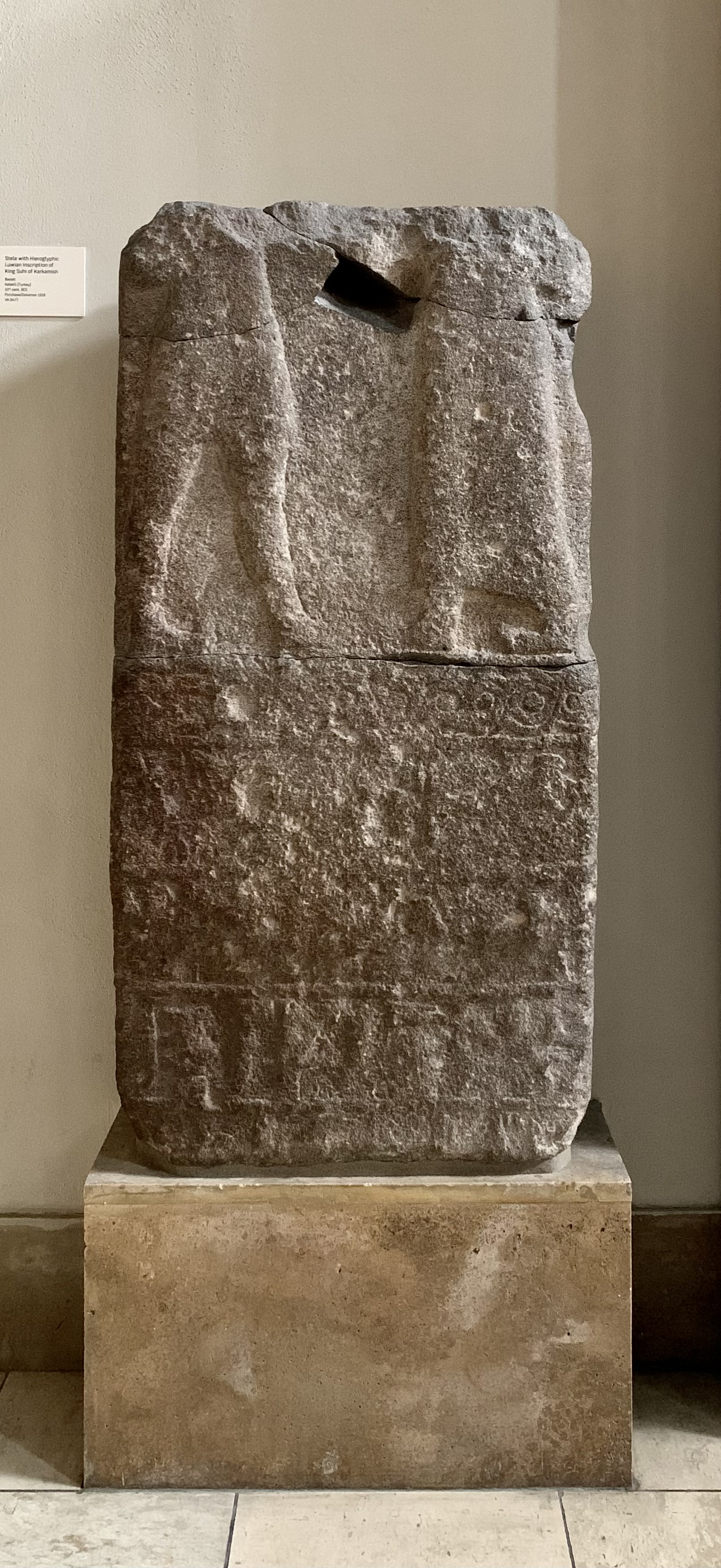

The House of Suhi was a dynasty of rulers of Carchemish. The members of this dynasty are best known to us through Hieroglyphic Luwian sources. Only one member of the house of Suhi is specifically mentioned in Assyrian sources. The House of Suhi was followed by a dynasty known as the House of Astiruwa.

== Suhi I ==
Suhi I was the first known ruler of the dynasty named after him. Bearing the title of ruler, he probably ruled in the early 10th century BC. None of his own inscriptions have survived, but he is mentioned in the inscriptions of his successors and in an inscription of a son named Arnu-..., who was a priest of Kubaba. This inscription on a stele of Arnu-... also mentions a military victory of a Carchemishaean king named Uratarhunza. Uratarhunza was the last Great King of Carchemish, probably ruling in the late 11th or early 10th century BC. It is possible that Suhi I was a local ruler under Uratarhunza's overlordship before acceding to the throne of Carchemish. So Arnu-... perhaps paid homage to his father's precursor.

== Astuwalamanza ==
Astuwalamanza, previously read Astuwatamanza, was a ruler of Carchemish probably reigning in the mid-10th century BC. He bore the title of country-lord. Astuwalamanza was the son of his predecessor Suhi I and the father of his successor Suhi II. Nothing more is known about him.

== Suhi II ==
Suhi II, son of Astuwalamanza, was a probably late 10th century BC ruler of Carchemish bearing the titles ruler and country-lord. Suhi II was married to a woman named BONUS-ti and he was the father of his successor Katuwa. He married his daughter to a king named Tudhaliya who surely was not identical with Tudhaliya, great king of Carchemish who was thought to have reigned in the late 11th or early 10th century BC. It is known that Suhi II made military operations. He destroyed a city named Alatahana and made reference to a city named Hazauna.

== Katuwa ==
Katuwa, son of Suhi II, is the best known ruler from the House of Suhi in Hieroglyphic Luwian sources. Bearing the titles ruler and country-lord he reigned probably in 10th or early 9th century BC, possibly around 880 BC. Despite the fact that Katuwa undertook military expeditions, e.g. against the city Sapisi on the Euphrates or the fortified city Awayana, he is better known as a constructor. He rebuilt the temple of the Storm god of Carchemish, constructed TAWANI apartments and upper floors for his wife Ana, embellished ancestral gates and erected divine statues for ancestors such as Atrisuha, the soul of Suhi. During his reign, Katuwa had to fight with the "grandsons" (descendants) of Uratarhunza. Those descendants of the last Great King of Carchemish seemingly searched to rule Carchemish, so Katuwa reacted against those ambitions.

== Sangara ==
Prior to 2015, Sangara, the next ruler of Carchemish, was only known from Assyrian sources from the years 870–848 BC, where he is mentioned both as tributary of and rebel against the Assyrians. Likely Sangara became ruler of Carchemish not long after Katuwa.

In 2015, Sangara was also identified in Hieroglyphic Luwian after the top part of the basalt stele of Kubaba (goddess) from Karkemish, made by king Kamani around 790 BC, was discovered. He is documented for 870 to 848 BC.

== Literature ==
- Trevor Bryce: The World of the Neo-Hittite Kingdoms: A Political and Military History. Oxford University Press: Oxford, New York 2012. ISBN 978-0-19-921872-1
- Annick Payne: Iron Age Hieroglyphic Luwian Inscriptions. Society of Biblical Literature, Atlanta 2012. ISBN 978-1-58983-269-5
- Gwendolyn Leick: Who's Who in the Ancient Near East. Routledge, London 1999, 2002. ISBN 978-0-415-13231-2
- Alessandra Gilibert: Syro-Hittite Monumental Art and the Archaeology of Performance. De Gruyter, Berlin 2011, 978-3-11-022225-8.

Preceded by Archaic Kings of Carchemish	Dynasty of Kings of Carchemish probably 10th century - 848 BC	Succeeded by House of Astiruwa
