= Tegarama =

Bronze Age city in Anatolia

Tegarama (Old Assyrian: Tergarma; Hittite: Takarama; Luwian: Lakarma/Lukarma) was a city in Anatolia during the Bronze Age. It is often identified with Gürün and biblical Togarmah.

== History ==
=== Middle Bronze Age ===
- Karum tablets: Tegarma/Tagarma (Te-ga-ar-ma), Tergarma/Targarma (Tar-ga-ar-ma)

The city contained a palace, a karum and an Assyrian colony office. It was important in terms of trade which included tin, textiles, wool, livestock, slaves and wine. The city was inhabited during the Old Assyrian Kingdom and Hittite Empire.

- A logistic hub (wabartum, smaller trading station) acting as a station for donkey caravans traveling between Assur and the main Anatolian trading center, Kanesh.
- The region produced wool and textiles which were high-demand commodities.
- In the Old Assyrian network, Tegarama was strategically positioned between the karum of Hahhum (near the Euphrates) and the central karum of Kanesh. It served as the gateway where caravans transitioned from the Mesopotamian foothills into the central Anatolian highlands.

==== Middle Bronze I ====
MB I (c. 2000–1836 BCE): This corresponds to the Kültepe Level II period. This was the golden age of the trade network. Most of the 22,000+ tablets found at Kanesh come from this era. During MB I, Tegarama functioned primarily as a wabartum (trading station), facilitating the movement of textiles and tin into central Anatolia.

==== Middle Bronze II ====
MB II (c. 1836–1700 BCE): This corresponds to the Kültepe Level Ib period. After a period of destruction and a short abandonment, the network was revived. During MB II, the political landscape shifted; the native Anatolian kingdoms became more powerful and centralized. Some scholars suggest Tegarama's status may have been elevated to a karum, reflecting the city's growth in importance during the later stage of the trade system.

=== Late Bronze Age ===
- Hittite: Takarama

==== Reign of Tudhaliya III ====
The city was sacked by Isuwa during the early reign of the Hittite king Tudhaliya III on the eastern border.

==== Reign of Suppiluliuma I ====
During his victorious campaign against Mitanni, Hittite king Suppiluliuma I halted in Tegarama and inspected his forces before attacking and capturing Karkemish. Consequently, city must have been on the road from Hattusa to Karkhemish.

=== Iron Age ===
A fortified city in Kammanu (on the border of Tabal) mentioned in Neo-Assyrian royal inscriptions of the ninth, eighth, and seventh centuries BC (reigns of Shalmaneser III, Sargon II, and Sennacherib) as Til-garimmu/Til-garimme.

==== Reign of Sargon II ====
The vassal ruler of Melid, Tarḫun-azi, revolted against Sargon's rule, seeking assistance from king Midas of Phrygia. After Sargon sacked Melid, Tarḫun-azi sought refuge in Til-garimme. Sargon eventually captured the city, imprisoned Tarḫun-azi and his family, and incorporated the city into the empire.

==== Reign of Sennacherib ====
The city seems to have been occupied by the armies of a certain king called Gurdî, king of the city Urdutu (possibly identical to Gurdî the king of Kulumma), who was warring against Sennacherib. Sennacherib besieged the city, incorporated the use of battering rams. Sennacherib claims to have destroyed the city, turning it into a "mound of ruins" (lit. tīlli-ù-karme, which some scholars speculate to be a pun). It is possible this pun was used previously by Tiglath-pileser III in reference to the city, which he located in Gurgum.

== Biblical tradition ==
The city is sometimes associated with Biblical Togarmah.

In Ezekiel 27:14, Togarmah is described as a trading partner of Tyre. The text specifies their primary export: "They of the house of Togarmah traded in thy fairs with horses and horsemen and mules." (KJV) Historical scholarship often links this to the Hittite or Neo-Assyrian province of Til-Garimmu, known for its horse breeding.

== Theories ==
The exact location of the city in Anatolia is disputed. Oliver Gurney placed Tegarama in Southeast Anatolia. Others have located it in central Anatolia near the town of Gürün, Sivas about 90 miles (140 km) east of Kanesh.

=== Gürün ===
Til-garimmu is usually identified with modern Gürün, biblical Tōgarmā, classical Gauraene/Gauraina, Old Assyrian Tergarama, Hittite Takarama, and Luwian Lakarma/Lukarma. However, no pre-Roman remains have been discovered at Gürün.

=== Akçadaǧ ===
Akçadaǧ, ca. 30 km west of Malatya, has been tentatively suggested as an alternate location.

=== Changing location ===
One theory is that the name of the city was 'moved' to another settlement during the history.

== Bibliography ==
- YAMADA, SHIGEO. "The City of Togarma in Neo-Assyrian Sources" Altorientalische Forschungen, vol. 33, no. 2, 2006, pp. 223-236. https://doi.org/10.1524/aofo.2006.33.2.223
