= PUGNUS-mili I =

PUGNUS-mili/Allumalli I
- Country-lord
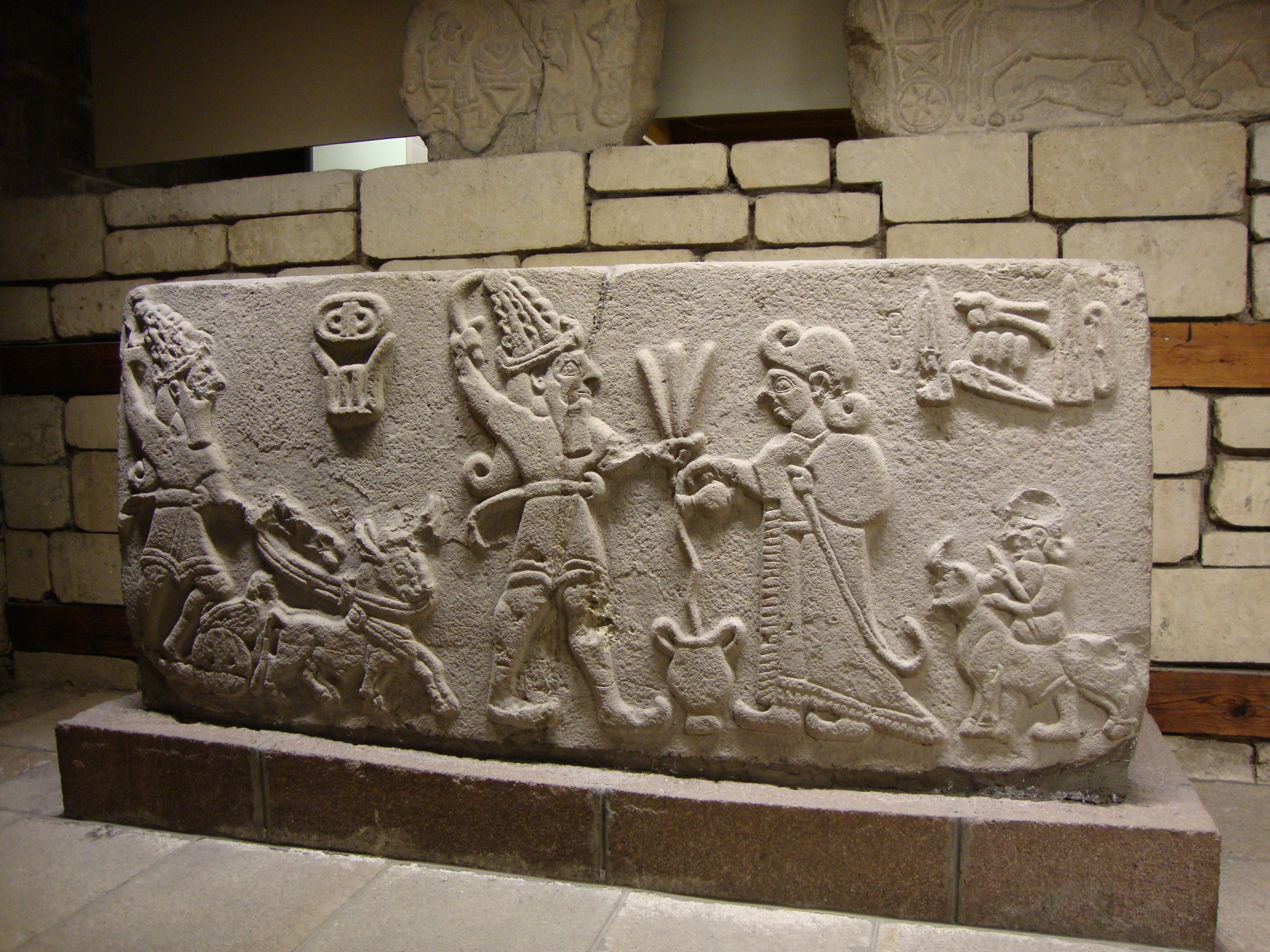
- Orthostat featuring inscription of a "PUGNUS-mili, King" from Arslantepe

Country-lord of Kammanu
- Reign: late 12th century BCE
- Predecessor: Kuzi-Teššub
- Successor: Runtiya
- House: House of Tudhaliya I
- Father: Kuzi-Teššub

PUGNUS-mili I was a king of the Neo-Hittite polity of Kammanu, centered at Melid, during the early Iron Age (~12th century BCE). The reading of this individual's name is uncertain.

== Identity and attestations ==
PUGNUS-mili is the transcription of a royal name written in Anatolian hieroglyphs, the word "PUGNUS" representing a fist-shaped sign. The reading of this name is uncertain, but Assyrian cuneiform sources suggesting this king's name was in fact Allumalli, Allumili or Allumari. PUGNUS-mili was mentioned in the genealogical inscriptions of his son Runtiya (Inscriptions Gürün and Kötükale) and great-grandson Arnuwanti (stele from Darende), each rulers of Melid. These inscriptions name Kuzi-Teshub, king of Carchemish, as having been the father of PUGNUS-mili, but they do not refer to either as ever having been a king of Melid. This leaves ambiguity as to whether or not PUGNUS-mili was a king of Melid. An orthostat from Arslantepe (archaeological site of Melid) depicts a "King PUGNUS-mili" pouring libations for the Storm God, but it is unknown whether this depicts PUGNUS-mili I or II.
