= Halpasulupi (king of Melid) =

Halpasulupi was a Neo-Hittite king of the polity called Kammanu, centered at the city of Melid (Malatya), during the Iron Age, around the 11th century BCE.

== Attestations ==
Halpasulupi is attested by an orthostat at Arslantepe, depicted in the act of hunting for lions, where he writes that "These shootings are of Halpasulupis, grandson of Taras, lord of the city Malizi, son of Wasu(?)runtiyas, the king." Halpasulupi is a Hittite name, being held by one of the sons of the Empire king Muršili II. Halpasulupi's grandfather Taras was the author of the stele of Izgın.
