= Kammanu =

Neo-Hittite state in the late 2nd millennium BC

Kammanu 𒆳𒄰𒈠𒉡 Malizi (𔒃𔒗𔖩)
- c. 1200–712 BC
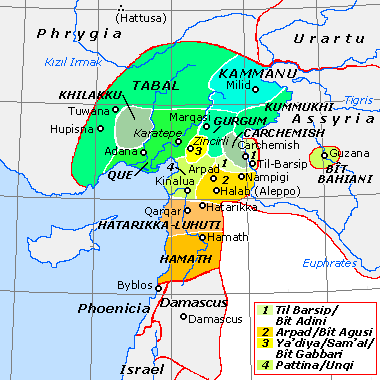
- Kammanu and its capital Melid/Milid among the Neo-Hittite states
- Capital: Melid
- Common languages: Hieroglyphic Luwian
- Religion: Luwian religion
- Government: Monarchy
- Historical era: Iron Age
  - Established: c. 1200
  - Disestablished: 712 BC
| Preceded by | Succeeded by |
| Hittite empire | Neo-Assyrian Empire |
- Today part of: Turkey

Kammanu (Neo-Assyrian Akkadian: 𒆳𒄰𒈠𒉡, ^{KUR} kam-ma-nu) or Malizi (Luwian: 𔒃𔒗𔖩, MA_{x}.LI_{x}-zi) was a Luwian-speaking Neo-Hittite state in a plateau (Malatya Plain) to the north of the Taurus Mountains and to the west of Euphrates river in the late 2nd millennium BC, formed from part of Kizzuwatna after the collapse of the Hittite Empire. Its principal city was Melid.

== History ==
=== Sources ===
There are a few primary sources which can be used to reconstruct the history of the polity of Kammanu:

- The inscriptions of Neo-Assyrian kings, especially royal annals;
- The less common Hieroglyphic Luwian inscriptions from Kammanu itself.

However, there are still gaps in the Kammanean record which make its history more difficult to reconstruct.

=== Early history ===
The earliest archaeological levels at the archaeological site of Arslantepe, the Melid of the Iron Age, date to the mid-to-late fifth millennium BCE, or more precisely between 4300 and 3900 BCE, during a time period known as the Chalcolithic, or Copper Age. During the Uruk period (c. 3300 BCE), there existed a large palace complex at Melid.

==== Hurrian and Hittite periods ====
Melid and the region of Malatya at large, were, during the Middle Bronze Age (c. 1600 BCE), part of the Hurrian kingdom of Ishuwa, which fell under the sphere of influence of the Mitanni Empire, a large state populated by Hurrians which flourished during this time.

The wars of the Hittite Great King Šuppiluliuma I against Mitanni's king Tushratta brought Ishuwa under Hittite control, and Šuppiluliuma used Melid as a base of operations for their gradual conquest of the Mitanni, beginning with the sack of the Mitanni capital of Waššukanni. The Malatya region remained part of the periphery of the Hittite Empire for the remainder of the existence of the Hittite Empire, despite attacks from certain kings of the Middle Assyrian Empire against the Hittites in Eastern Anatolia.

Around 1200 BCE, the Hittite state collapsed as a result of numerous factors, including, but not limited to, drought, disease, attacks by the Sea Peoples, and raids by the Kaskians. Many other state societies in the ancient Near East at that time were either destroyed or heavily affected by similar events. This period of societal collapse is known as the Late Bronze Age Collapse. Despite the apparent turmoil across Mesopotamia and into Anatolia, Malatya was largely unaffected by this Bronze Age Collapse.

=== Independent Neo-Hittite kingdom ===
After the fall of the Hittite Empire, a level of authority was still present among the Luwian lands in the southeast of Anatolia as well as across Syria. A scion of the Hittite royal dynasty held a position of power in the city-state of Carchemish, a fiefdom granted to Šarri-Kusuh during the reign of Šuppiluliuma I, and several small kingdoms arose in the region of Tabal.

Kuzi-Teshub was the first king of Carchemish after the fall of the Hittite Empire. He was one of the few remaining direct descendants of the great kings of the Hittites, and seeing that the title of "Great King" itself was left vacant after the abandonment of Hattusa, he simply claimed the title for himself. Kuzi-Teshub's domain was based at Carchemish, but he also held power over the city of Melid.

==== Malizi ====
After the death of Kuzi-Teshub, the kingdom he had built was split between two royal lines, one controlling Carchemish, and one controlling Malatya, which the Luwians called Malizi. Kuzi-Teshub's son, named PUGNUS-mili I, received the land of Malizi, and he ruled over it as its "country-lord." During this time, the city of Melid was expanded and its material culture flourished. PUGNUS-mili's son, Runtiya, changed the Malizean royal title from country-lord to king, and as a show of his strength as a ruler, etched his inscription into the mountain at Gürün.

Many of the kings and rulers of the various Neo-Hittite city-states took the names of Hittite great kings, Malizi being no exception. The name of king Arnuwanti I, brother of Runtiya, who most likely succeeded Runtiya on the throne, is possibly a reference to or translation of, the name of one of three Hittite great kings named Arnuwanda.

PUGNUS-mili II was the son of Arnuwanti. During his reign, the Assyrian king Tiglath-Pileser I was making conquests across Syria. On a campaign in the region, King Tiglath-Pileser requested that PUGNUS-mili send tribute. This event is recorded in Assyrian records, where the name PUGNUS-mili is recorded as Allumari, perhaps the true pronunciation of the name which is difficult to transcribe.

Arnuwanti II was the son of PUGNUS-mili, and was named after his grandfather. His connection with his grandfather Arnuwanti is recorded by the İspekçür and Darende monuments which he commemorated.

The monumental Luwian hieroglyphic inscriptions were continued in the 10th century BC throughout Kammanu by kings such as Taras and Halpasulupi. During the 9th and early 8th century, the entire region of southeastern Anatolia was increasingly brought under the control of the Kingdom of Urartu, who placed vassal kings such as Hilaruada on the throne. From this point onwards, there were no Luwian royal inscriptions made as most of the available records of Kammanu came from the inscriptions of Urartu and Assyria. In 719 BC, the Assyrian king Sargon II deposed Gunzinanu, the ruler of Kammanu, and replaced him with a Malizean warlord named Tarhunazi, who swore an oath of loyalty to the Assyrian throne. Tarhunazi, however, became disgruntled as a vassal under the rule of Assyria. He contacted Mita, king of the Mushki (Phrygians), enemies of Assyria, to aid him in a rebellion. However, Tarhunazi's plan failed, and he fled, but was caught by Sargon and deposed. Kammanu was annexed by Assyria and the city of Melid was placed under the rule of Mutallu, king of Kummuh.

== Rulers ==
- Kuzi-Teššub (Luwian: 𔗜𔖩𔓢 ku-zi-TONITRUS)
- PUGNUS-mili I (Luwian: 𔐨𔖻𔔹 PUGNUS-mi-li), son
- Runtiya (Luwian: 𔑳 CERVUS), son
- Arnuwanti I (Luwian: 𔒞𔗬𔐞𔕮 AVIS_{2}-wa/i-tá-sa_{5}), brother
- PUGNUS-mili II (Luwian: 𔐨𔖻𔔹 PUGNUS-mi-li), son
- Arnuwanti II (Luwian: 𔒞𔗬𔐞𔕮 AVIS_{2}-wa/i-tá-sa_{5}), son
- PUGNUS-mili III (Luwian: 𔐨𔖻𔔹 PUGNUS-mi-li)
- CRUS-ra/i-sa
- Wasu(?)runtiya
- Halpasulupi
- Suwarimi
- Mariti, son of Suwarimi
- Sahwi, could be identical with Sahu
- Sa(?)tiruntiya, could be identical with Hilaruada
- Sahu, Urartian vassal
- Hilaruada, Urartian vassal
- Sulumal, 743 – 732 BC
- Gunzinanu, until 719 BC, deposed by the Assyrians
- Tarhunazi (Neo-Assyrian Akkadian: 𒁹𒋻𒄷𒈾𒍣, romanized: ᵐTarḫunazi), Assyrian vassal, 719 – 713 BC
- Mutallu, Assyrian vassal, 713 – 708 BC
- (Assyrian rule 708 – 675 BC)
- Mugallu, also king of Tabal
- x-ussi, son of Mugallu

== See also ==
- Ancient regions of Anatolia
