= Tarhunazi =

- King of Melid
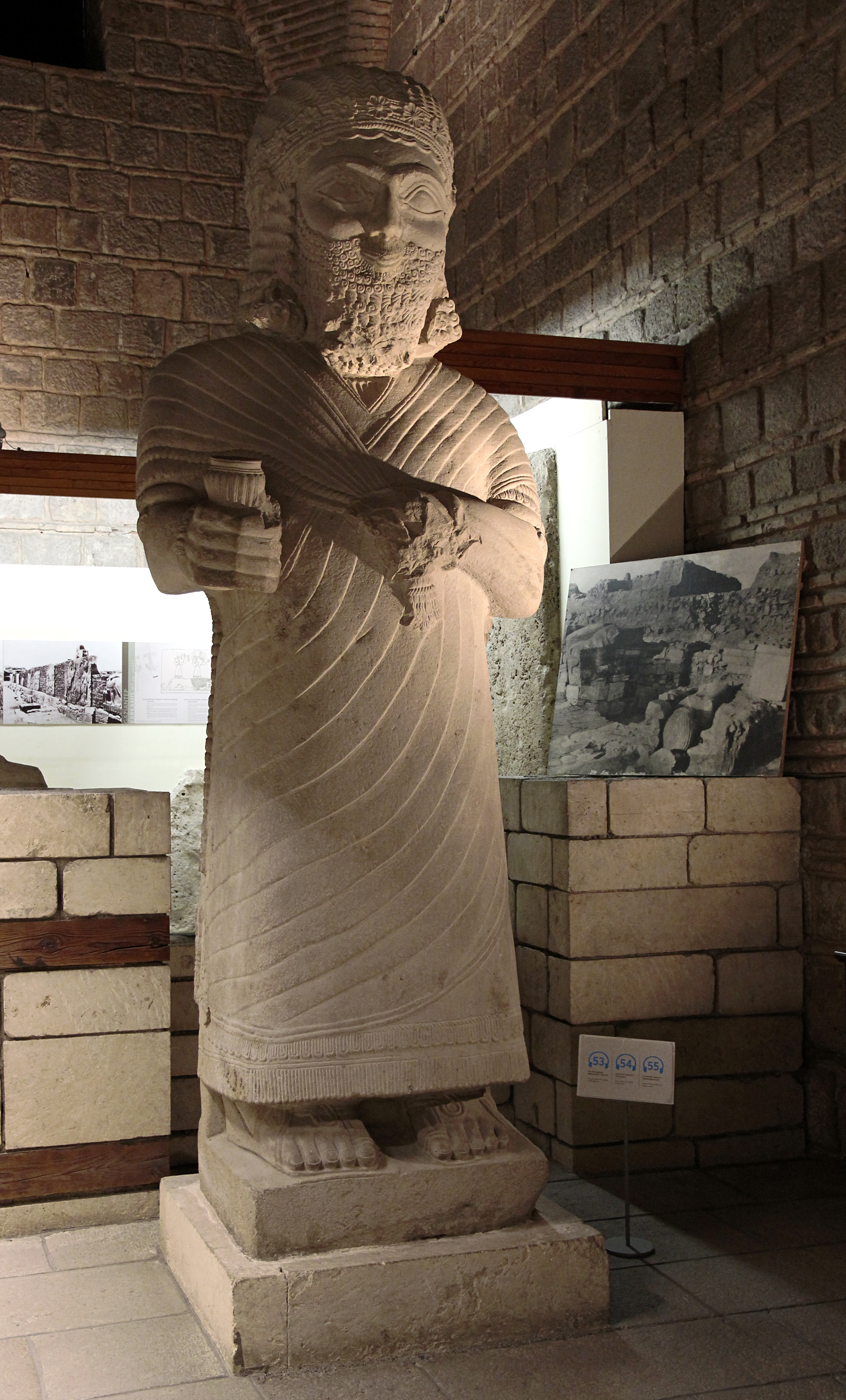
- Statue from Arslantepe once thought to depict Mutallu, king of Kummuh, but now thought to represent Tarhunazi

King of Kammanu
- Reign: c. 719 – 712 BCE
- Predecessor: Gunzinanu
- Successor: Mutallu of Kummuh
- Father: Gunzinanu (?)

Tarḫunazi (Neo-Assyrian Akkadian: 𒁹𒋻𒄷𒈾𒍣, ^{m}tar-ḫu-na-zi) was a Neo-Hittite king of the Iron Age state of Kammanu, centered on the city of Melid, from c. 719 – 712 BCE. Tarḫunazi was installed in the third year of king Sargon II (719 BCE) as an Assyrian vassal, to replace a certain Gunzinanu the Kammanean, but was replaced when he broke his oath of loyalty to the Assyrians.

== Attestations ==
By the 8th century BCE, the tradition of hieroglyphic Luwian inscriptions of the kings of Melid had come to an end. Therefore, all of the events of the reign of Tarḫunazi of Melid are derived solely from contemporary Assyrian accounts. The reign of Tarḫunazi is primarily attested by the annals of Sargon II, who had numerous encounters, militarily and diplomatically, with several of the Neo-Hittite states in the region.

The name Tarḫunazi itself is derived from the name of the chief Luwian storm god Tarḫunz, a common element of Neo-Hittite theophoric names.

== Reign ==
=== Rise to power ===
In 719 BCE, King Gunzinanu of Kammanu was deposed from the Kammanean throne by the Assyrians. Tarḫunazi, possibly son of Gunzinanu, swiftly took control of the power vacuum, claiming the throne of Kammanu, with his capital at Melid. The same year, Sargon II appointed Tarḫunazi as his vassal. Giving an oath of loyalty to the King of Assyria, Tarḫunazi became a tributary of the Neo-Assyrian Empire.

=== Rebellion against Assyria and correspondence with Mushki ===
Discontent at being relegated to a dependent of Assyria, Tarḫunazi eventually (c. 713 BCE) decided to rebel against Assyria. At this time, Tarḫunazi held correspondence with Mita, the ruler of Mushki and an enemy of Assyria. (Note: Mushki was the Assyrian name for Phrygia and Mita was probably the Midas known to the Greeks.) Possibly, Mita pressured Tarḫunazi to join the growing Mushki sphere of influence across Anatolia, as he had done with Ambaris, who was the king of Kammanu's neighbor Tabal, and a former ally of Assyria, (Note: The alliance between Ambaris and the Assyrians was strong: Ambaris was educated in Assyria, and married a daughter of Sargon II) and was also at the moment corresponding with the Mushki king. Word soon reached Nineveh, the capital of Assyria, of Tarḫunazi's overturning of his oath of loyalty.

=== Flight to Til Garimmu and defeat ===
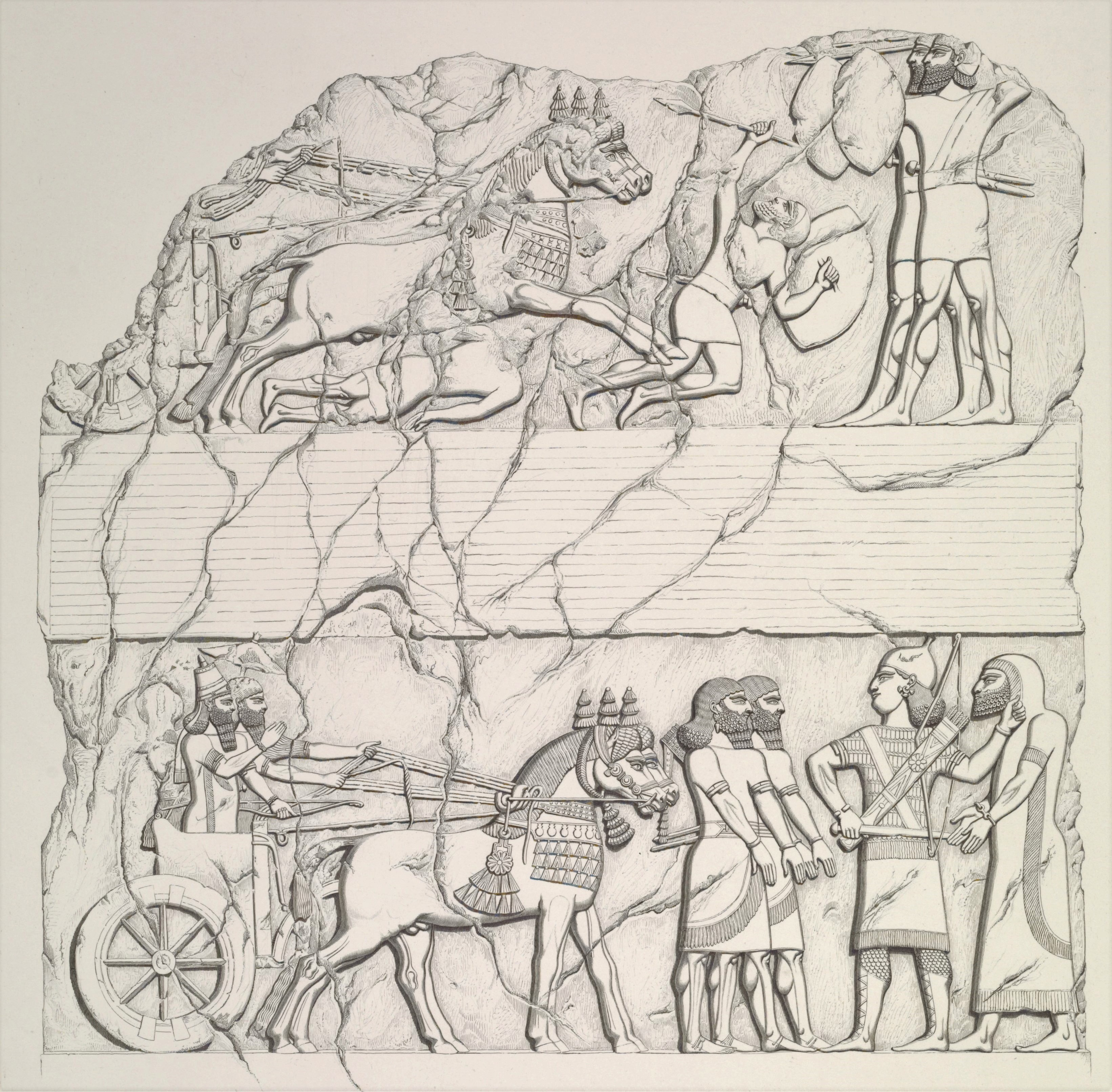
Reliefs from Dur-Sharrukin depicting Sargon II and Assyrian soldiers in battle

In the tenth year of the reign of Sargon II (712 BCE), the Assyrian king decided to punish Tarḫunazi for his disloyalty. He overran Kammanu with the force of a mercenary army of Suteans, (Note: The Suteans were an indigenous group which inhabited the Euphrates from the city of Mari to the border of Babylonia, who were subdued by the Assyrians on multiple occasions.) and laid a heavy siege upon Melid, the capital. Consequently, Tarḫunazi hastily exited the city of Melid, and fled to the fortress of Til Garimmu, near the border with Tabal. Til Garimmu had previously been a Hittite fortress, by the name of Tegarama. At Til Garimmu he sought refuge and was taken into the fortress, but this did not protect him from Sargon, who captured the fortress and transported Tarḫunazi and family to Nineveh, where he likely served his punishment for defying the king of Assyria. In place of Tarḫunazi, another Hittite named Mutallu, an Assyrian vassal who had already held rule over the neighboring kingdom of Kummuh, was placed on the Kammanean throne.
