= Arnuwanti II =

- King of Melid
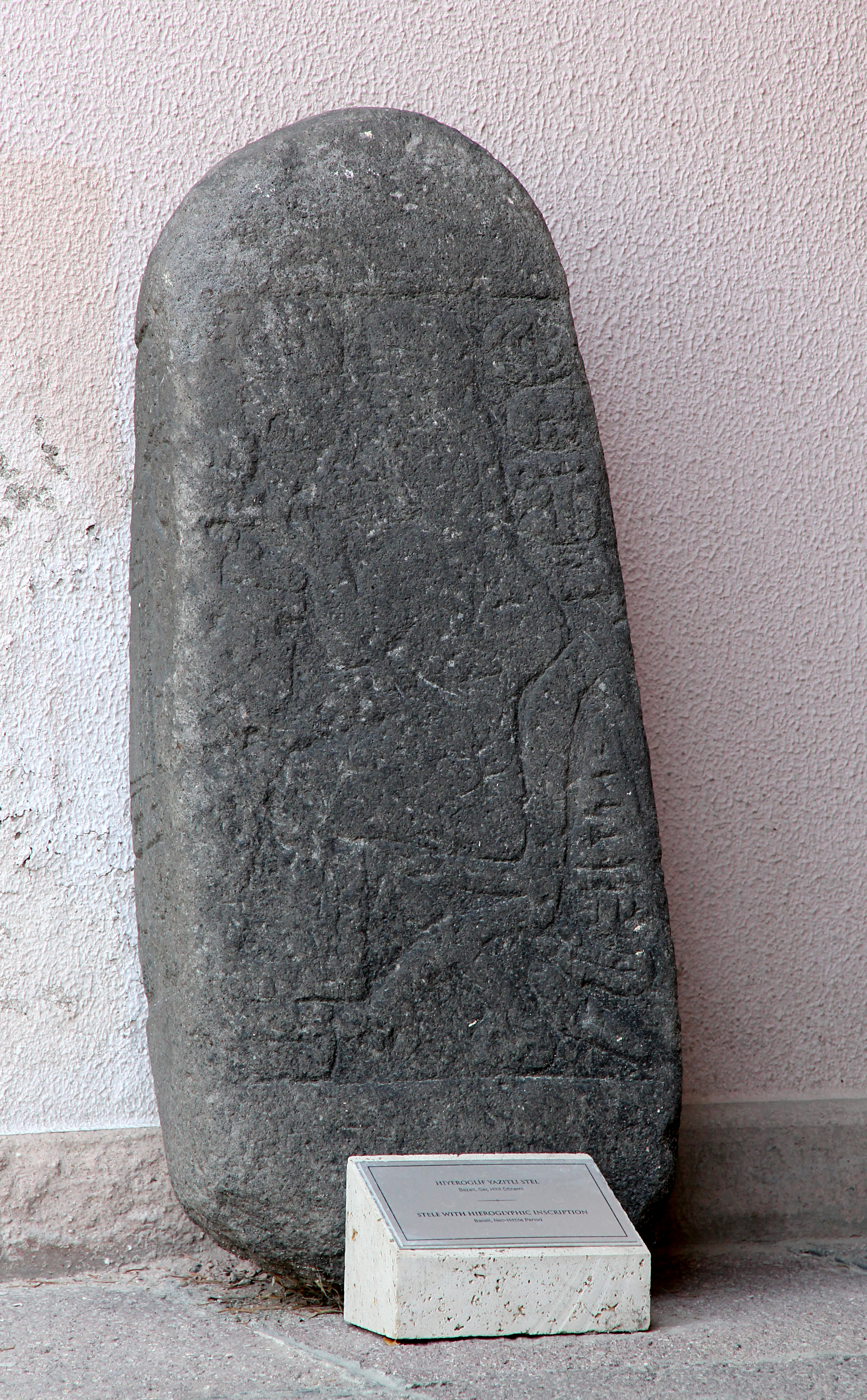
- Darende stele, dedicated to goddess Hebat by king Arnuwanti II.

King of Kammanu (Melid)
- Reign: 11th century BCE
- Predecessor: PUGNUS-mili II
- Successor: PUGNUS-mili III or CRUS-RA/I-sa

Arnuwanti II was a Neo-Hittite king of the Iron Age polity of Kammanu, centered at Melid (Arslantepe) during or around the 11th century BCE.

== Attestations ==
Arnuwanti II was the creator of two stelae (monoliths) written in Luwian hieroglyphs: one at İspekçür, and one at Darende. In his inscriptions, he calls himself "Arnuwantis the King". In the İspekçür stele, Arnuwanti traces his lineage. From this, it can be deduced that he was the son of a certain PUGNUS-mili II, and the grandson of another Arnuwanti, probably the brother of Runtiya, who authored the Gürün rock inscription. If this is true, then Arnuwanti is a late descendant of the royal house of the Hittite Empire, through Kuzi-Teshub, the grandfather of Runtiya and possibly Arnuwanti I. A similar genealogical inscription also occurs on the Darende stele, as well as a dedication to the important Syrian goddess Hebat "of the city".

== See also ==
- List of Neo-Hittite kings
