= PUGNUS-mili II =

- King of Melid
- Reign: late 12th – early 11th century BCE
- Predecessor: Arnuwanti I
- Successor: Arnuwanti II

PUGNUS-mili II was a Neo-Hittite king of the polity of Kammanu, centered at Melid, during the 12th or 11th century BCE.

== Name and attestations ==
=== Luwian sources ===
PUGNUS-mili is the transcription of a name written in Luwian hieroglyphs. The reading of the sign "PUGNUS" is uncertain, so conventionally it is left unmapped to any phonetic value. PUGNUS-mili II can be attributed to any of a number of Malizean orthostats featuring the inscribed name "PUGNUS-mili," however, so could either of two kings of Melid also called PUGNUS-mili. In addition, PUGNUS-mili is mentioned on the Darende stele by his son Arnuwanti, another ruler of Melid, which reveals that PUGNUS-mili was in turn, the son of an earlier king Arnuwanti I.

=== Assyrian sources ===
The Assyrian records state that the King of Assyria Tiglath-Pileser I (r. 1114–1076 BCE) requested tribute from Allumari of Melid, probably PUGNUS-mili. The Assyrian king also received tribute from an Ini-Teshub, king of Hatti (Carchemish). The two were distantly related, through Kuzi-Teshub, an earlier ruler of both kingdoms, to the Great Kings of the Hittite Empire.
