= Malatya (disambiguation) =

Malatya is a city in Turkey.

Malatya may also refer to nearby places in Turkey:

- Malatya Province
- Malatya Plain
- Malatya Mountains, part of Southeastern Taurus Mountains
- Malatya SK, a sports club

== See also ==
- Malaita, a place in the Solomon Islands
