= Kfar Monash Hoard =

Archeological find in Kfar Monash, Israel

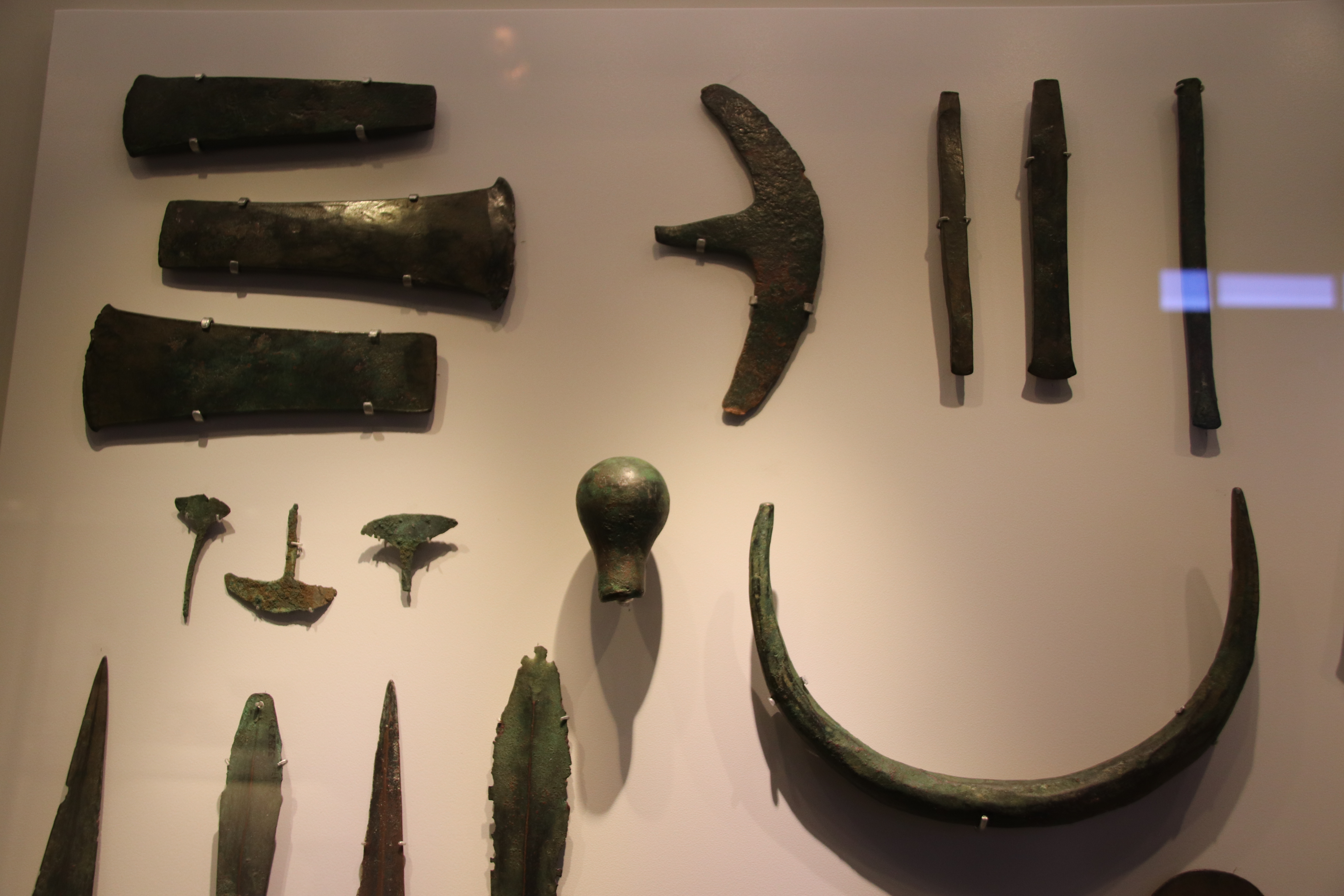
Copper Weapons & Tools, Kefar Monash Copper Hoard, 2950-2650 BC

The Kfar Monash Hoard is a hoard of metal objects dated to the Early Bronze Age (the third millennium BCE) found in the spring of 1962 by the agriculturalist Zvi Yizhar in Kfar Monash, Israel. Kfar Monash is located 3.3 km south-east of Tel Hefer (Tell Ishbar) in the Plain of Sharon or in modern terms 9 km/6 mi northeast of Netanya, which is roughly located along the Israeli coast between Netanya and Haifa.

The Monash Hoard consists of:

object	amount
Axes	6
Small Adzes	7
Large Adzes	4
Chisels	3
--square bars	(2)
--circular bar	(1)
Saw	1
Small Knife	1
Peg	1
Crescent	1
Long curved knives	2
Spear Heads	4
Daggers	4
Mace-Head	1
Copper Plates	800
Silver Mirror?	1
Carnelian Beads?	Several
Crescentic Axehead	1

The Crescentic Axehead was found about 5 years later at about 200m distance.

As of June 2006, the Kfar Monash Hoard was on display in the Israel Museum.

== Identification of the 800 Copper Plates ==
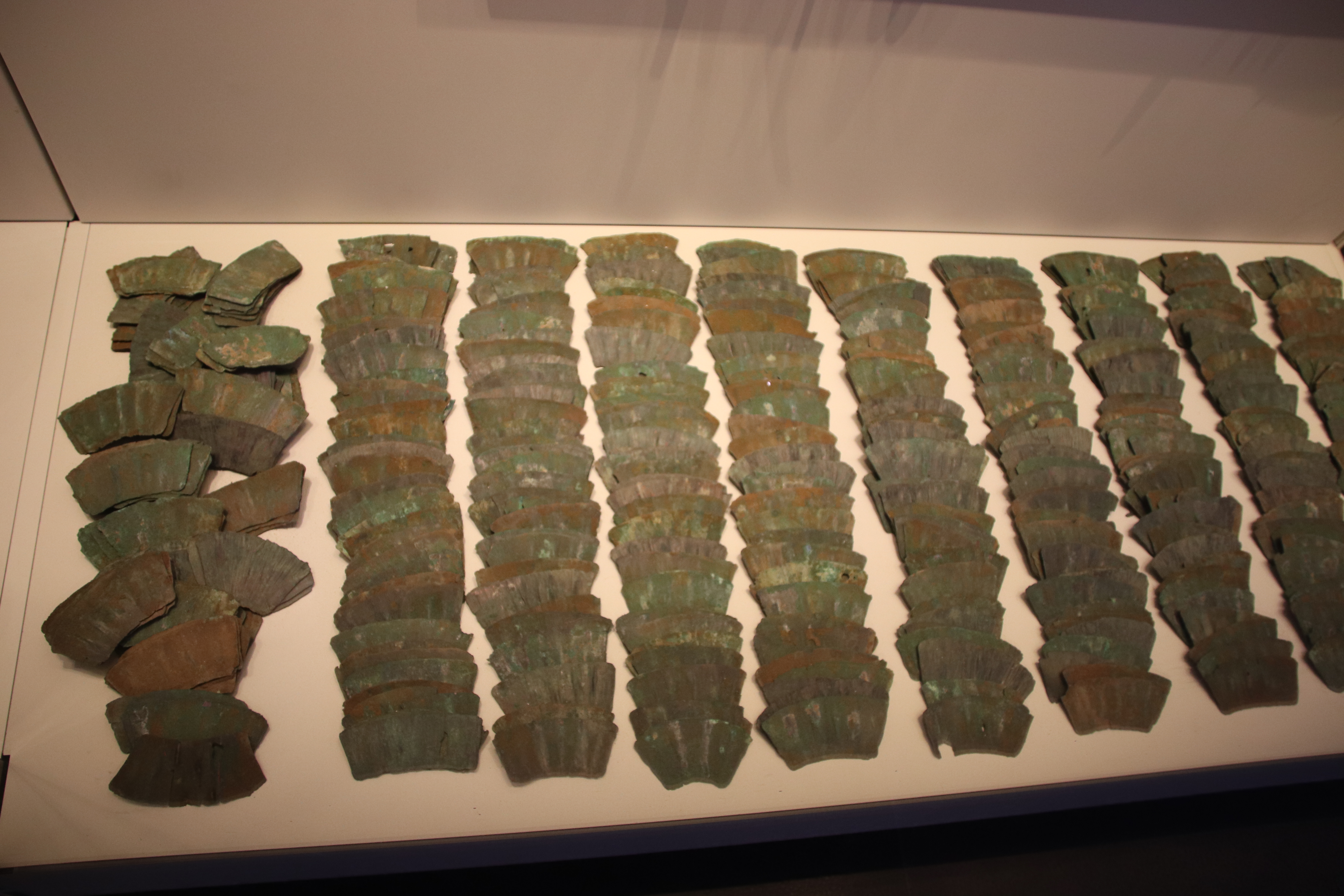
Copper Scale Armor, Kefar Monash Hoard. Israel Museum, Jerusalem

There has been conflicting ideas to the purpose of the 800 copper plates. Although they have been assumed to be scales of armor from an Egyptian army unit, as proposed by archaeologist Shmuel Yeivin, recent reevaluations have confuted this claim. Archaeologist William A. Ward proposed that the scales were means of barter or a reserve supply of metal from the Syro-Palestinian area. Ward arrived at this conclusion through several pieces of evidence: the scales were not attached to any jacket, body armor was generally not used by the Egyptians until the New Kingdom, copper was still very rare, and the plates were too thin for body armor.

== 2023 analysis ==
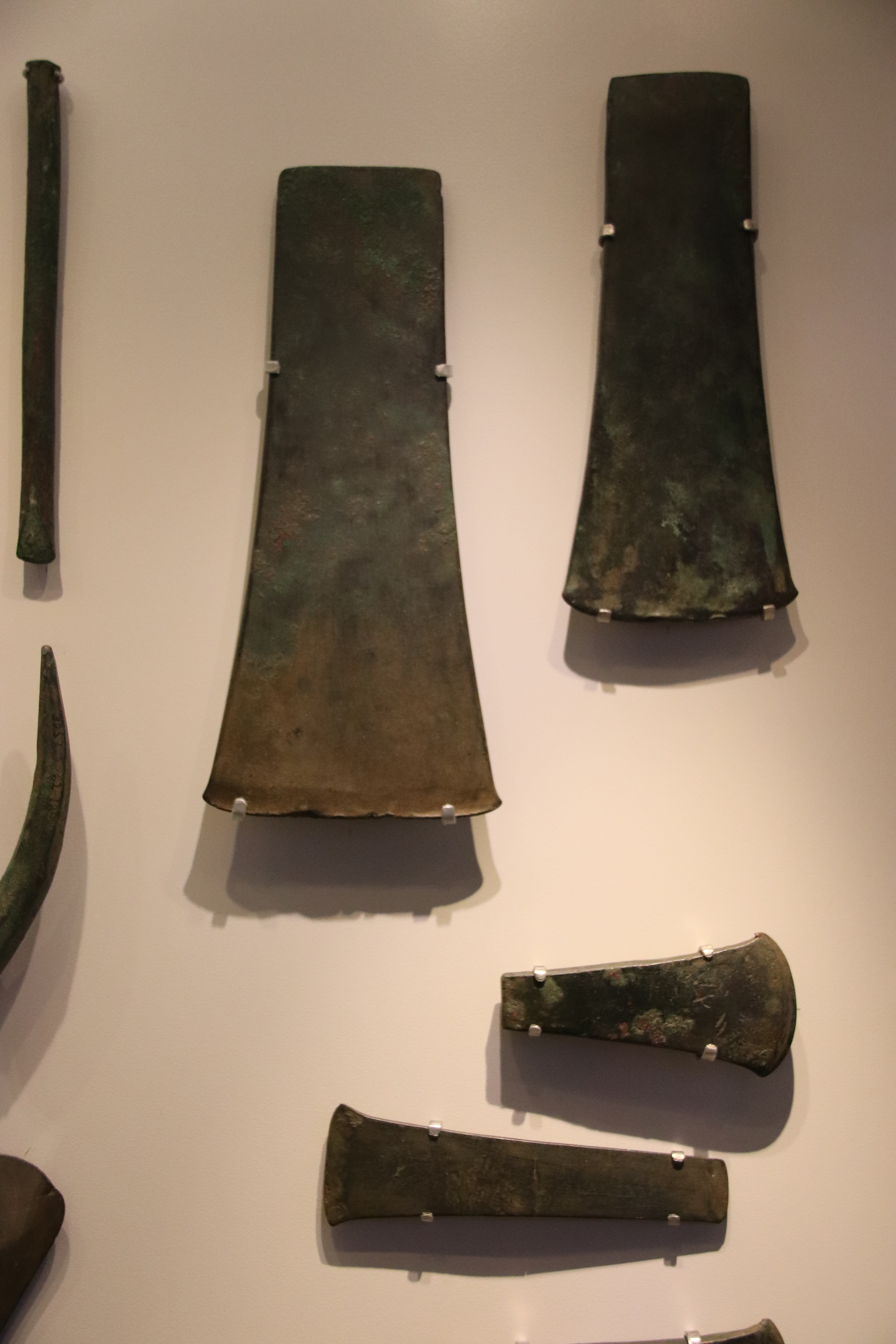
Egyptian type copper axes, Kefar Monash Copper Hoard. Israel Museum, Jerusalem

Several metal objects similar to those in the Kfar Monash hoard were found in this general area of the Levant. They were subject to metallurgical analysis, and generally dated to the Early Bronze Age. For example, objects from Ashkelon-Afridar, and from Tell esh-Shuna (the Jordan Valley) were seen as similar. Also the axes from early EB I Yiftah’el are seen as relevant.

Kfar Monash objects were also dated, based on typological considerations, to EB IB, similarly to the axes from Tel Beth Shean.

The study of Kfar Monash hoard indicated that some of them were made of unalloyed copper. The source of this unalloyed copper was found likely to be in Wadi Feynan, in southern Jordan. Such unalloyed copper was apparently mainly used for the production of tools.

Other objects were made using a CuAsNi alloy. This is the copper-arsenic-nickel alloy that is especially characteristic of Chalcolithic period Arslantepe in Eastern Anatolia (the upper Euphrates region). Nevertheless, the adzes that were made of this alloy were determined to be of "an Egyptian type".

Objects from Arslantepe using such polymetallic ores are mainly ascribed to Level VIA (3400–3000 BCE), dating to the Uruk period.
