= Marcella Frangipane =

Italian archaeologist

- Born: 10 October 1948 (age 77); Palermo
- Education: Sapienza University of Rome (BS, PhD)
- Awards: Foreign Associate of the National Academy of Sciences (2018)
- Scientific career
- Fields: Archaeology; Prehistory; Protohistory; Near East
- Workplaces: Sapienza University of Rome; Instituto Nacional de Antropología e Historia
- Website: www.lettere.uniroma1.it/users/marcella-frangipane

Marcella Frangipane (born 10 October 1948) is a professor of archaeology at the Sapienza University of Rome. She works on the prehistory and protohistory of the Near East and Middle East. She was elected a foreign associate of the National Academy of Sciences (NAS) in 2013.

== Early life and education ==
Frangipane was born in Palermo. She studied humanities with honours in archaeology at the Sapienza University of Rome, and graduated cum laude in 1972. Early in her career she spent three years in the Instituto Nacional de Antropología e Historia in Mexico, where she learned new techniques in anthropology. She has been involved with several excavations, in Europe, Mexico, Turkey and Egypt. She was involved the excavation of Cunalan village in the Teotihuacan valley. She has been involved with the excavation team of the Arslantepe since 1976.

== Research and career ==
Frangipane returned to the Sapienza University of Rome in 1981, where she eventually became a Professor in 1990. She led the School of Archaeology from 2000 to 2003, and was made Vice Director of the Late Predynastic site of Maadi. Frangipane studies the formation of bureaucratic and hierarchical structures in urban societies. She is mainly interested in the near and Middle East.

Frangipane was made Director of the Italian Archaeological Mission in Eastern Anatolia in 1990. She was involved with the excavation of Arslantepe, where she reconstructed their early administrative systems. This work was supported by the National Geographic. The settlement is west of the banks of the Euphrates and is well known for its architecture. Frangipane identified the most ancient secular public structure worldwide. Arslantepe was included in the UNESCO cultural heritage list in 2014 owing to the significance of Frangipane's findings. She investigated the site of Zeytinli Bahçe Höyük, a village in the Urfa district. Within Arslantepe, Frangipane led the team who discovered the word's oldest royal palace. She was also involved with excavations of

She was the first Italian woman to be elected a foreign associate to the National Academy of Sciences in 2013.

=== Awards and honours ===
Her awards and honours include;

- 1994 Ufficiale Ordine al Merito della Repubblica Italiana
- 2005 Cavaliere dell’Ordine della Stella della Solidarietà
- 2005 Honorary Citizenship of Eski Malatya
- 2011 İnönü University Honorary Doctorate
- 2013 Elected to the National Academy of Sciences
- 2015 Shanghai Archaeology Forum Discovery Award
- 2015 Vittorio De Sica Prize for Science
- 2017 Rotondi Award for the Saviours of Art
- 2018 University of Sydney Anthony McNicoll Lecture
- 2021 Corresponding fellow of the British Academy

Frangipane s a member of the German Archaeological Institute and the Shanghai Archeology Forum.

=== Books ===
- Frangipane, Marcella (2001). Uruk Mesopotamia & Its Neighbors: Cross-Cultural Interactions in the Era of State Formation (School Leadership Library). School of American Research Press. ISBN 978-1930618022.
- Frangipane, Marcela (2007). Arslantepe Cretulae: An Early Centralised Administrative System Before Writing. L'Erma Di Bretschneider. ISBN 978-8890170171.
- Frangipane, Marcella (2017). The Origin of Inequality. Gangemi Editore. ISBN 978-8849247961.
