= Kfar Monash =

Moshav in central Israel

Kfar Monash: כפר מונש (Hebrew)
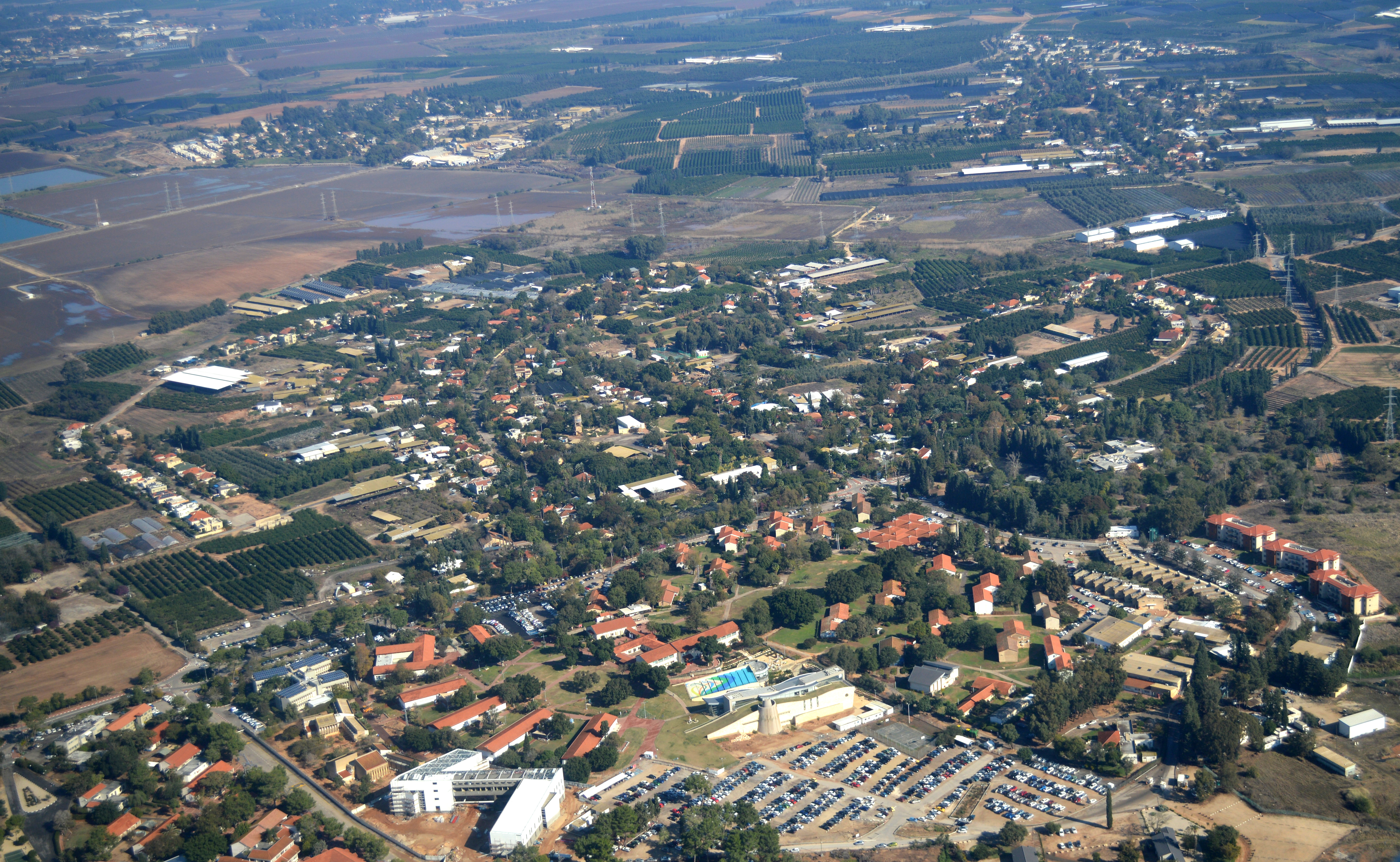

- Location within Central Israel Location within Israel
- Coordinates: 32°20′50″N 34°54′56″E
- Country: Israel
- District: Central
- Subdistrict: HaSharon
- Council: Hefer Valley
- Affiliation: Moshavim Movement
- Founded: 1946
- Founder: Australian-Jewish immigrants
- Population (2024): 953

Kfar Monash (Hebrew: כפר מונש, lit. 'Monash Village') is a moshav in central Israel. Located in the northern part of the Sharon plain and covering 2,700 dunams, it falls under the jurisdiction of Hefer Valley Regional Council. In 2024 it had a population of 953. The vast majority of its residents are Jewish.

== History ==
The moshav was founded in 1946 by Jewish former Australian servicemen, and was named after the Jewish Australian general, Sir John Monash. It is known among archaeologists as the finding place of the Kfar Monash Hoard.

The Ruppin Academic Center, established in 1949, is located nearby. At its founding, the village contained a sophisticated printing press and was engaged in producing maps and atlases. However, the economic crisis in the early 1950s led to its closure in 1953, and agriculture became the main livelihood of most residents.

Local agriculture and husbandry consists primarily of citrus orchards, but also includes growing flowers in greenhouses, and raising chickens and turkeys.

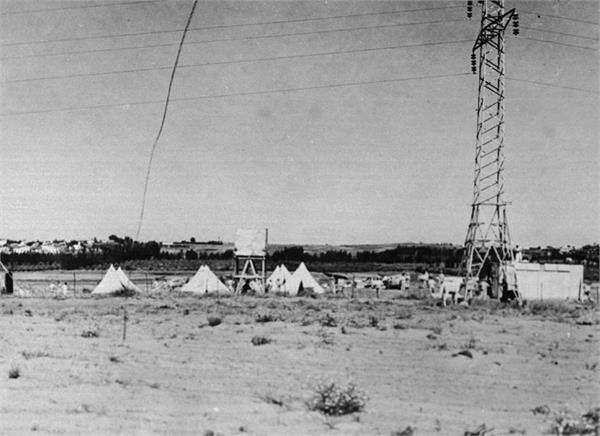
Kfar Monash 1946

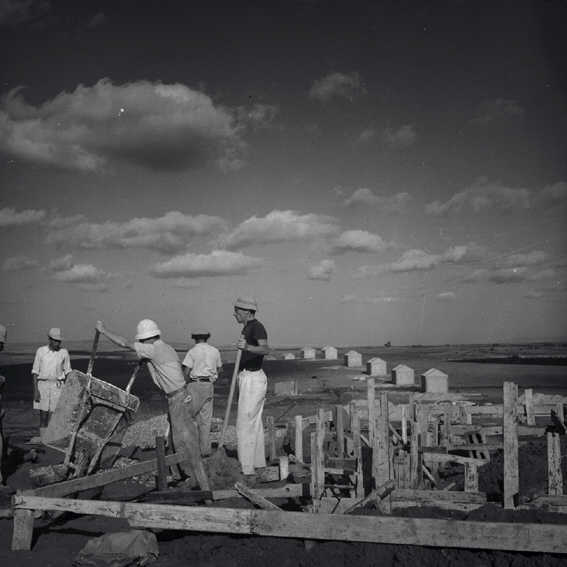
Kfar Monash 1947

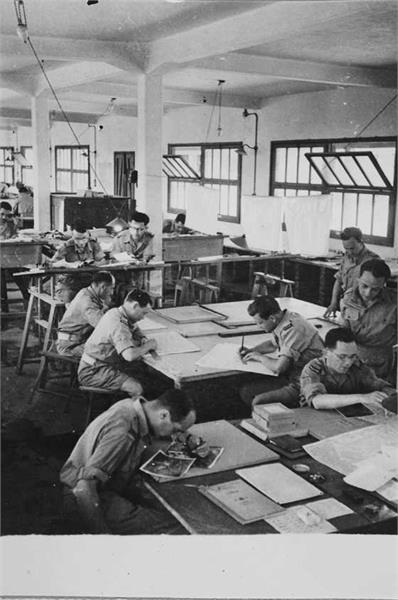
Kfar Monash 1946

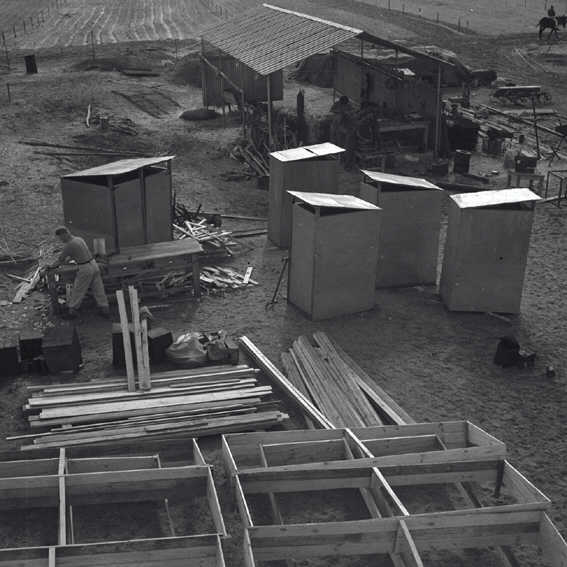
Kfar Monash 1947

== See also ==
- Kfar Monash Hoard
