= Runtiya (king) =

- Great King; Country-lord
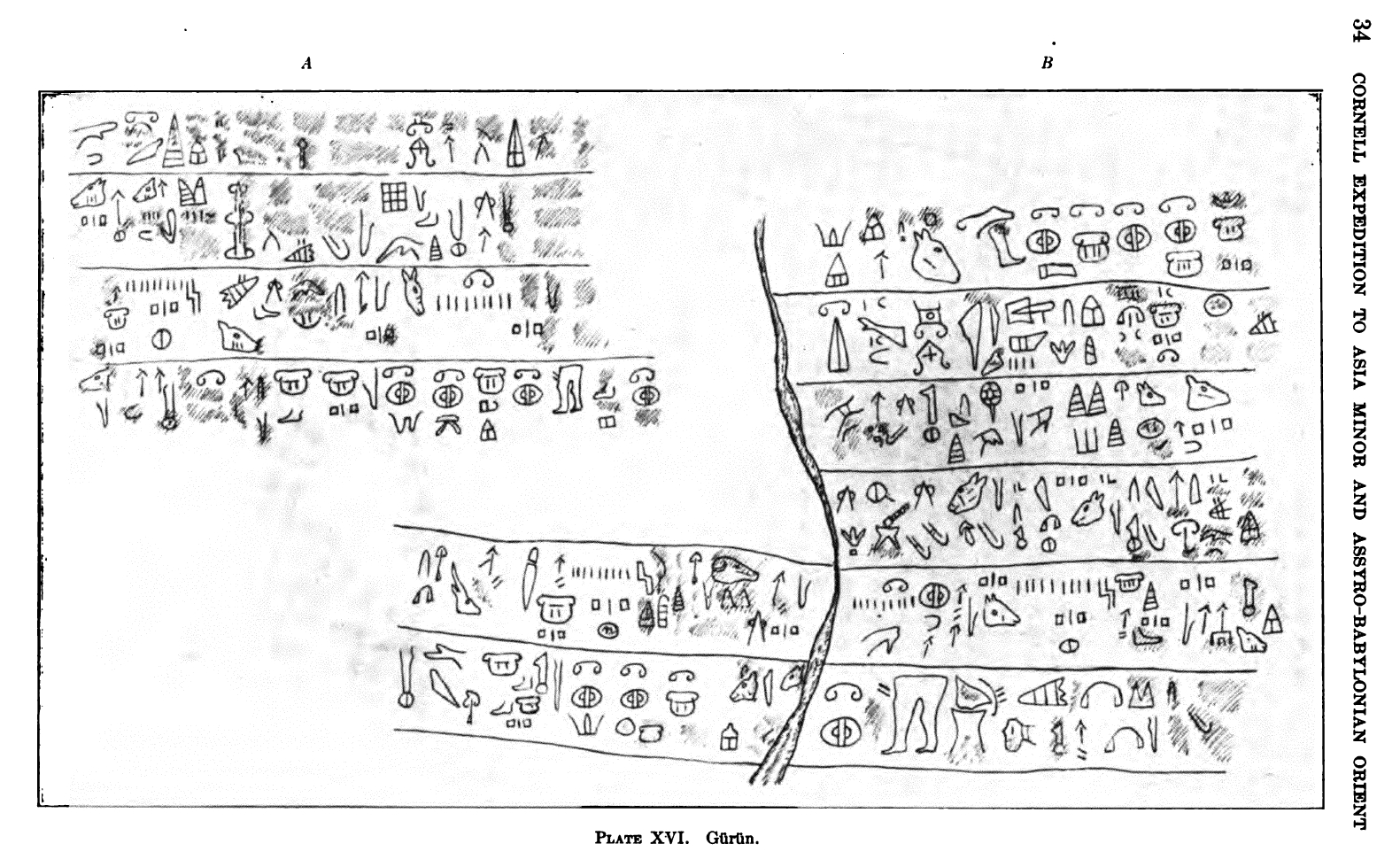
- Facsimile of the Gurun inscriptions of king Runtiya

King of Kammanu
- Reign: 12th or 11th century BCE
- Predecessor: PUGNUS-mili I
- Successor: Arnuwanti I (brother)
- House: House of Tudhaliya I
- Father: PUGNUS-mili I

Runtiya was a Neo-Hittite king of the polity of Kammanu, centered at the city of Melid, during the early Iron Age. He was the first member of the ruling dynasty of Melid to take the title of king, earlier rulers having been called "country-lords".

== Name and attestations ==
Runtiya is known from the rock inscriptions at the sites of Gürün and Kötükale, near Malatya in Turkey. The name "Runtiya" is derived from a Hittite god of the hunt, and is written in Luwian hieroglyphs with the symbol of the god, a stag's head. In his inscriptions, he identifies himself as "Country-lord" and "Great King," the son of PUGNUS-mili I and grandson of Kuzi-Teshub, the "hero" of Carchemish.
