= Arnuwanda =

Arnuwanda was the name of the three Hittite emperors:

- Arnuwanda I
- Arnuwanda II
- Arnuwanda III
