= Louis Joseph Delaporte =

French archaeologist and Hittitologist

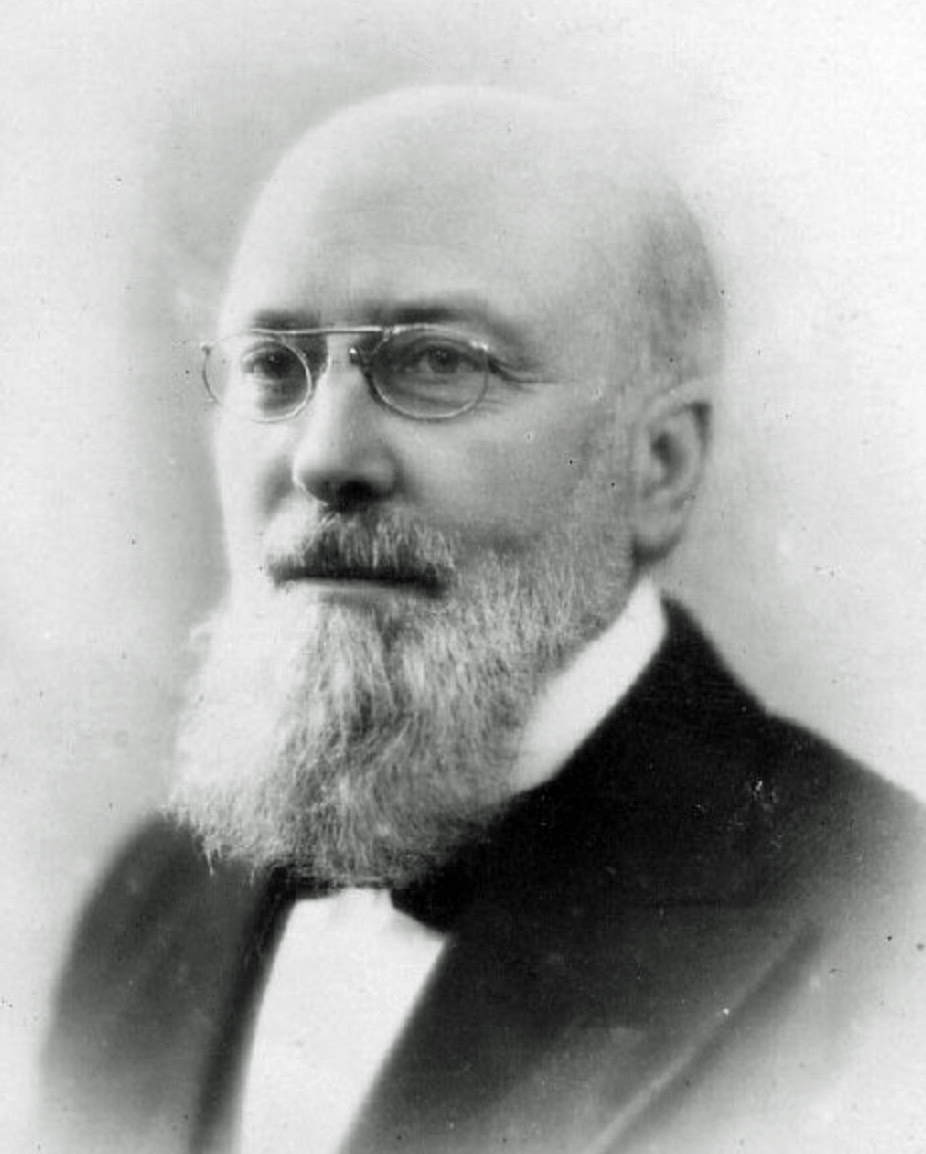
- Born: 22 October 1874; Saint-Hilaire-du-Harcouët, France
- Died: February 1944; Wohlau (Belgern-Schildau), Silesia

Academic work
- Discipline: archaeology
- Sub-discipline: Hittitology
- Notable works: Mesopotamia : the Babylonian and Assyrian civilization

Louis Joseph Delaporte, often known as Louis Delaporte (22 October 1874 – February 1944) was a French archaeologist and Hittitologist.

Louis Delaporte was born in Saint-Hilaire-du-Harcouët. He died in Wohlau (Belgern-Schildau) prison in Silesia in February 1944.

== Works ==
- Mesopotamia : the Babylonian and Assyrian civilization. Translated by V. Gordon Childe. 1925.
- Les Hittites (Paris: Renaissance du Livre, 1936).
