= Malatya Plain =

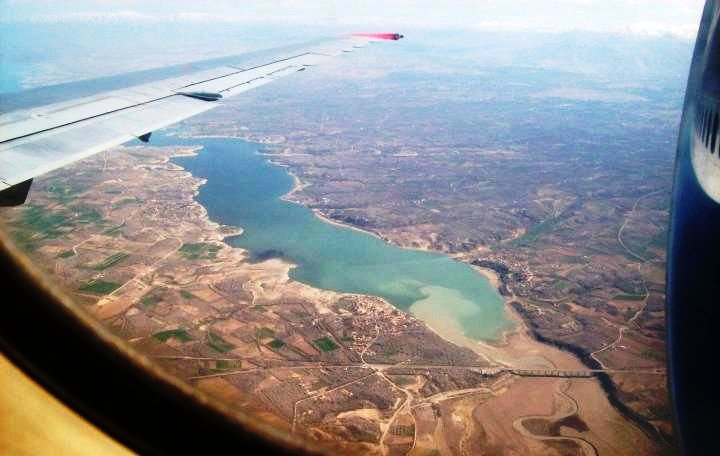
Malatya Plain

The Malatya Plain is a plain in Eastern Turkey between the Euphrates valley to the east and the Taurus Mountains to the south and southeast. Its altitude varies between 700 and 1100 meters above the sea level. The plain is somewhat unlevel, with undulating ridges and fells.

The climate in the area is semi-arid, because Taurus Mountains block precipitation originating from the Mediterranean Sea. The mean annual precipitation is low (350-400mm), mostly coming from snow. At the same time, the area is favorable for cultivation due to springs based on water-bearing strata and karst waters, and rivers coming from the mountains and converging into the Euphrates.

The plain is located on the Anatolian Plate near its edge by the seismically active East Anatolian Fault Zone and the seismically active North Anatolian Fault Zone.

The archaeological site of Arslantepe is located within the plain, an oasis 15 km south off the Euphrates.
