= Arslantepe =

Archaeological site in Turkey

Melid
- Location within Turkey
- 38°22′55″N 38°21′40″E
- Type: Settlement
- Location: Turkey
- Region: Malatya Province

Site notes
- Excavation dates: 1932–1939, 1946–1951, 1961–1968
- Archaeologists: Louis Delaporte, Claude F. A. Schaeffer, Piero Meriggi, Salvatore M. Puglisi, Alba Palmieri
- Condition: In ruins

UNESCO World Heritage Site
- Official name: Arslantepe Mound
- Criteria: Cultural: (iii)
- Designated: 2021 (44th session)
- Reference no.: 1622
- Area: 4.85 ha (12.0 acres)
- Buffer zone: 74.07 ha (183.0 acres)

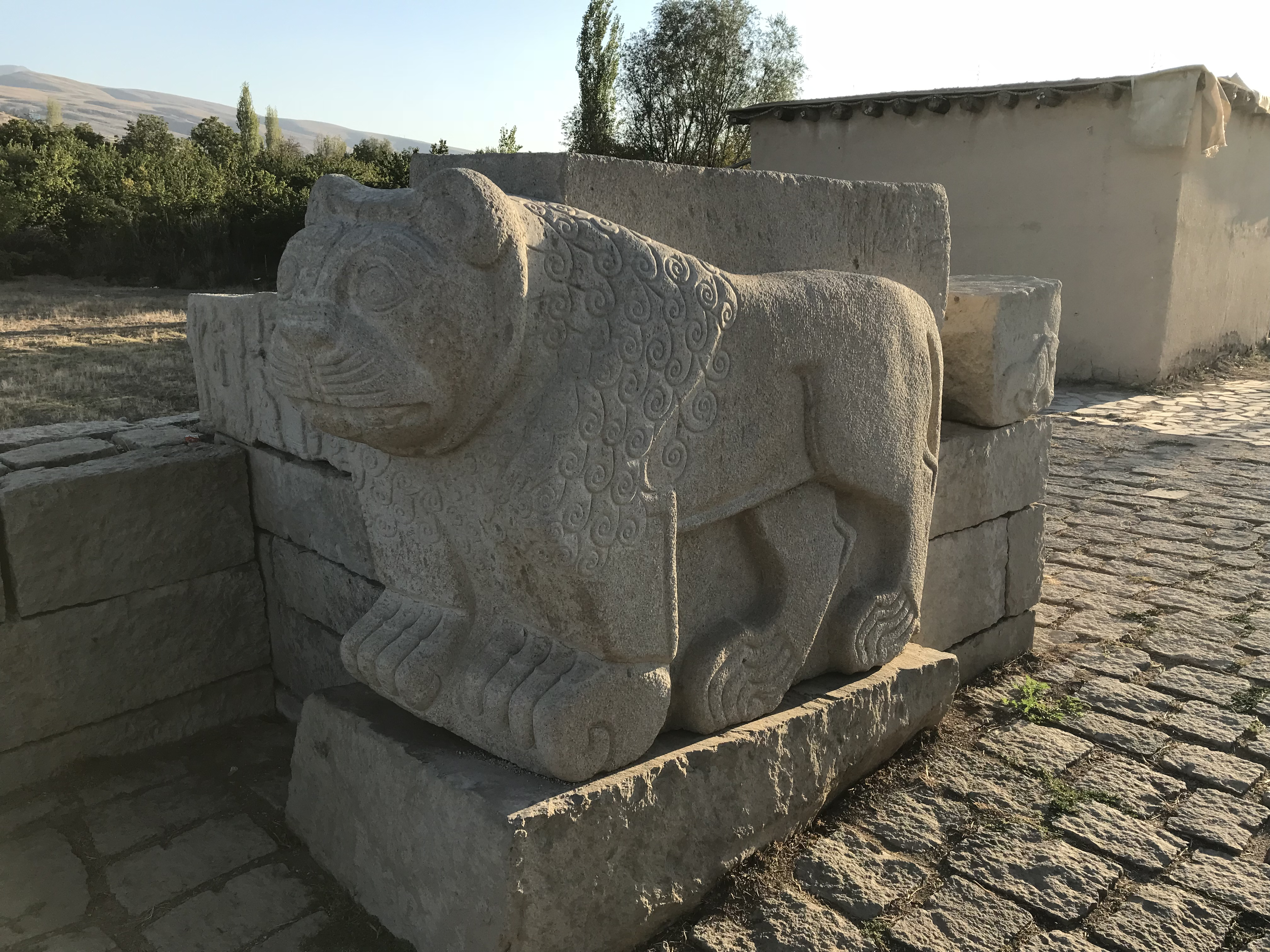
A Hittite lion from the Neo-Hittite era (1180-700 BC) at the entrance to the ruins of Arslantepe.

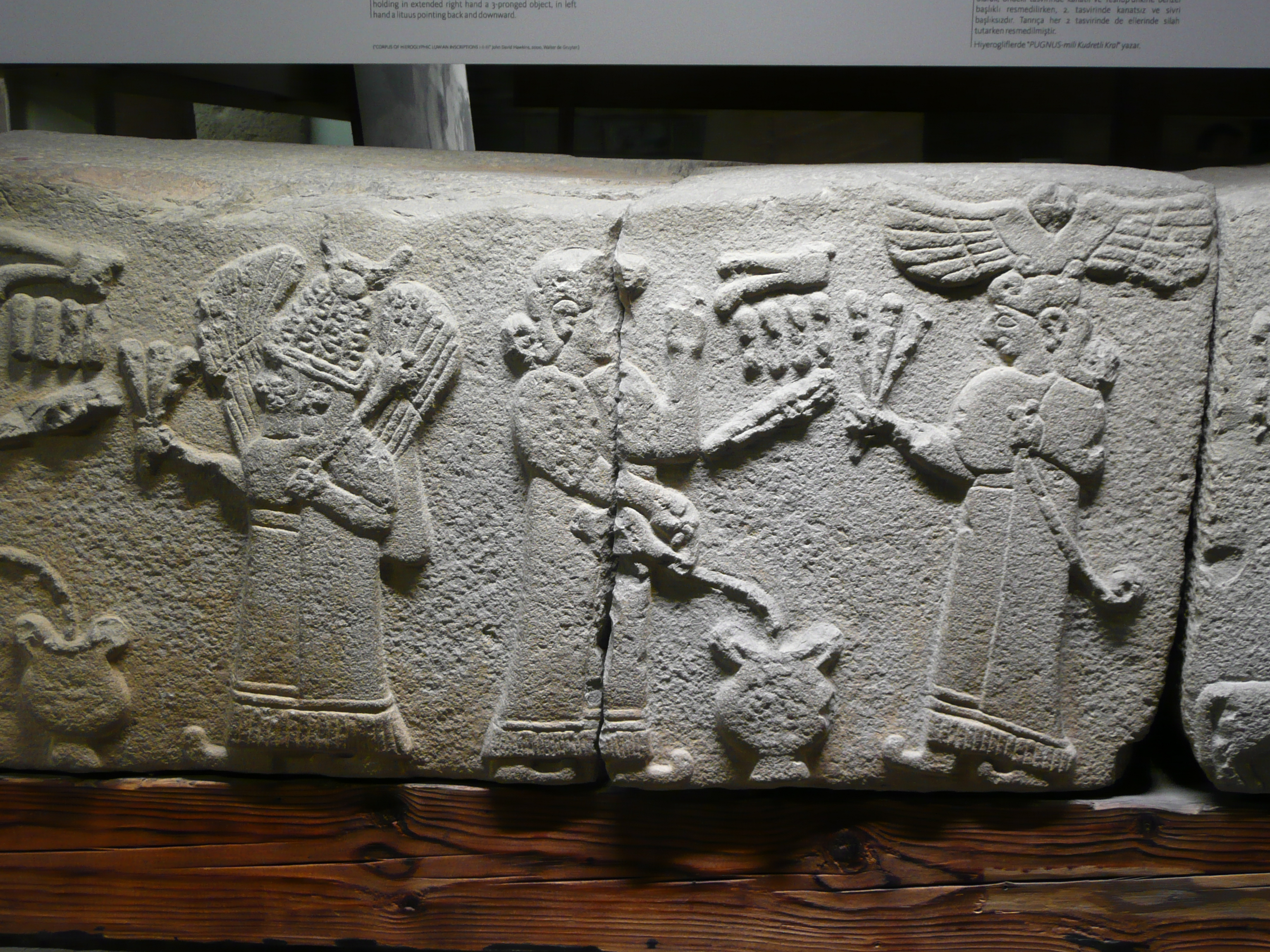
A Hittite relief of a libation to Tiwaz and Arma from the ruins of Arslantepe at the Museum of Anatolian Civilizations in Ankara.

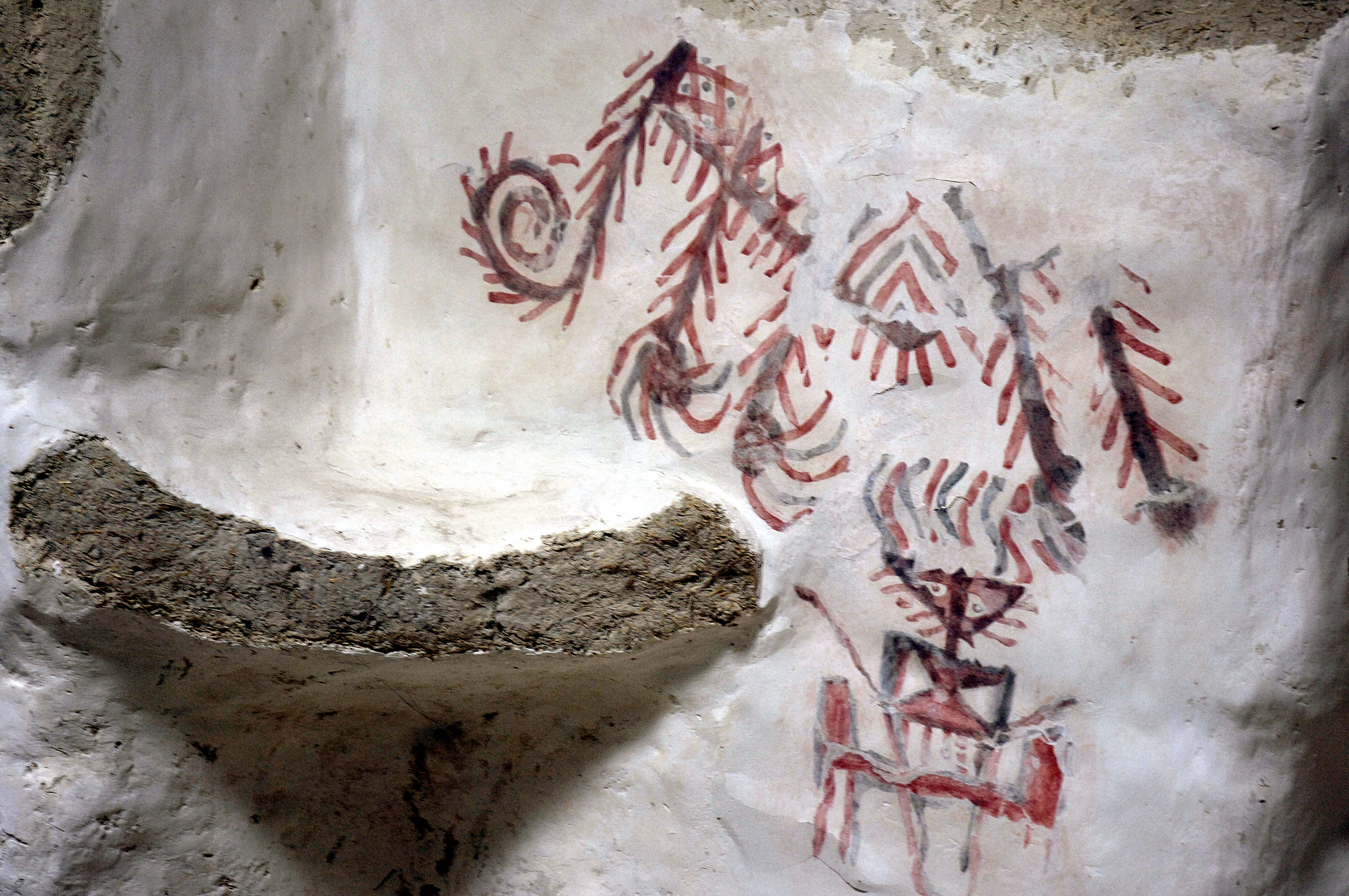
Wall paintings from Arslantepe dating to 3350-3000 BCE

Arslantepe, (Note: Hittite: Malidiya and possibly also Midduwa; Akkadian: Meliddu; Urartian: Melitea; Latin: Melitene;) also known as Melid, was an ancient city on the Tohma River, a tributary of the upper Euphrates rising in the Taurus Mountains. It has been identified with the modern archaeological site of Arslantepe near Malatya, Turkey.

It was named a UNESCO World Heritage Site under the name Arslantepe Mound in 2021. As of 2025 it is closed for maintenance.

Değirmentepe, a site located 24 km northeast of Melid, is notable as the location of the earliest secure evidence of copper smelting. The site was built on a small natural outcrop in the flood plain about 40m from the Euphrates River.

== History ==
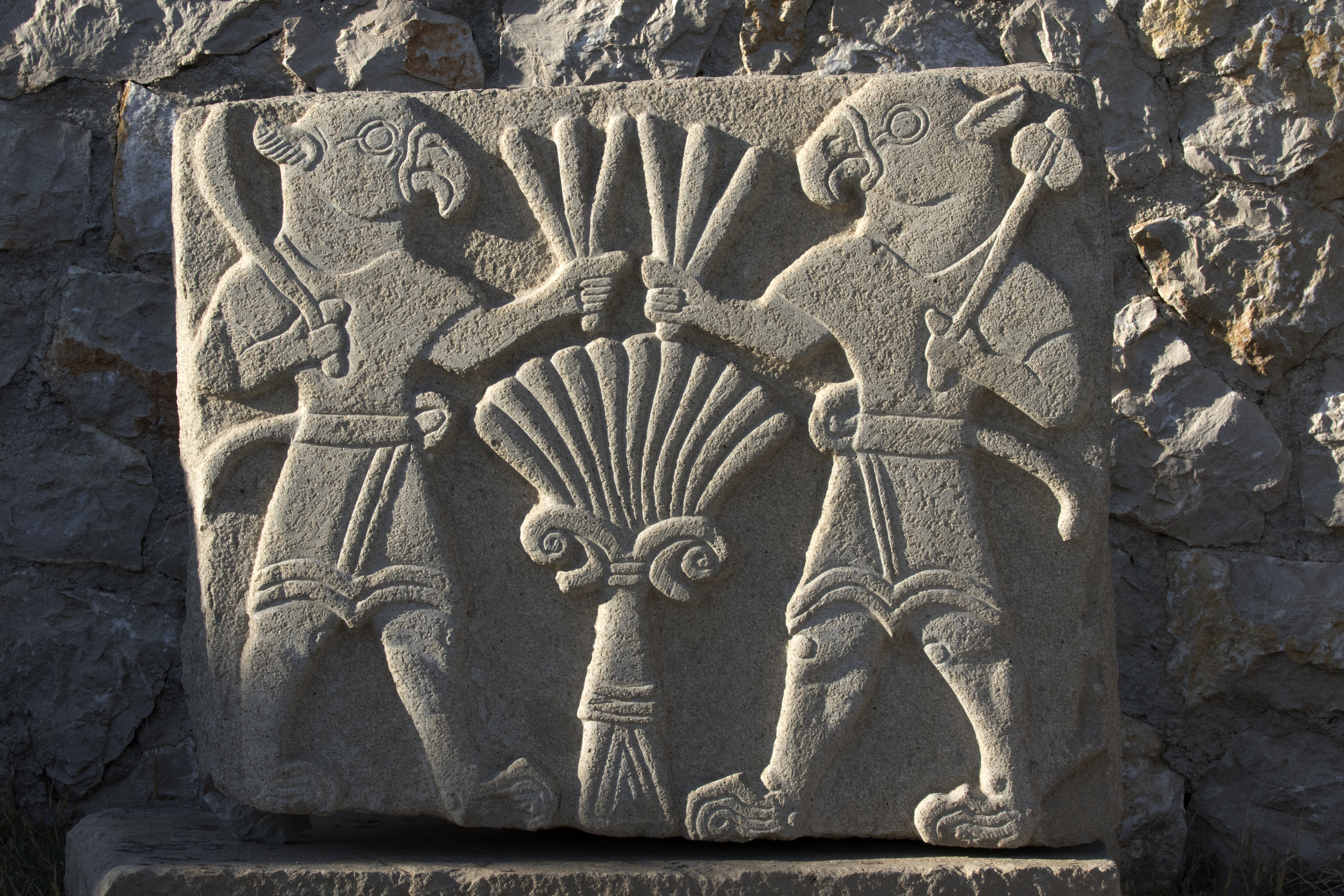
Carving of two "lionmen" (1200 BCE) at the entrance to the ruins of Arslantepe.

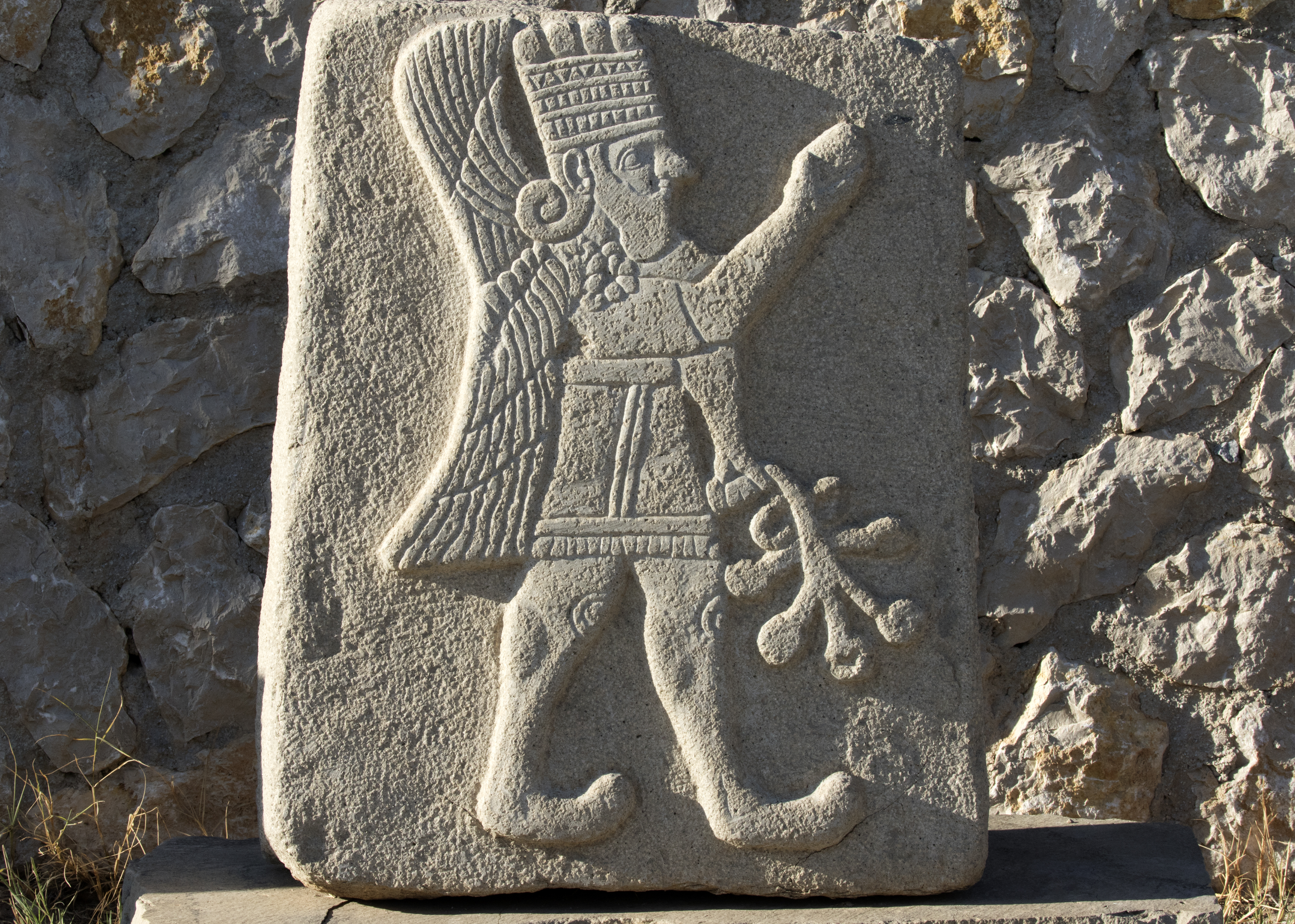
Stone carving at the entrance to the ruins of Arslantepe.

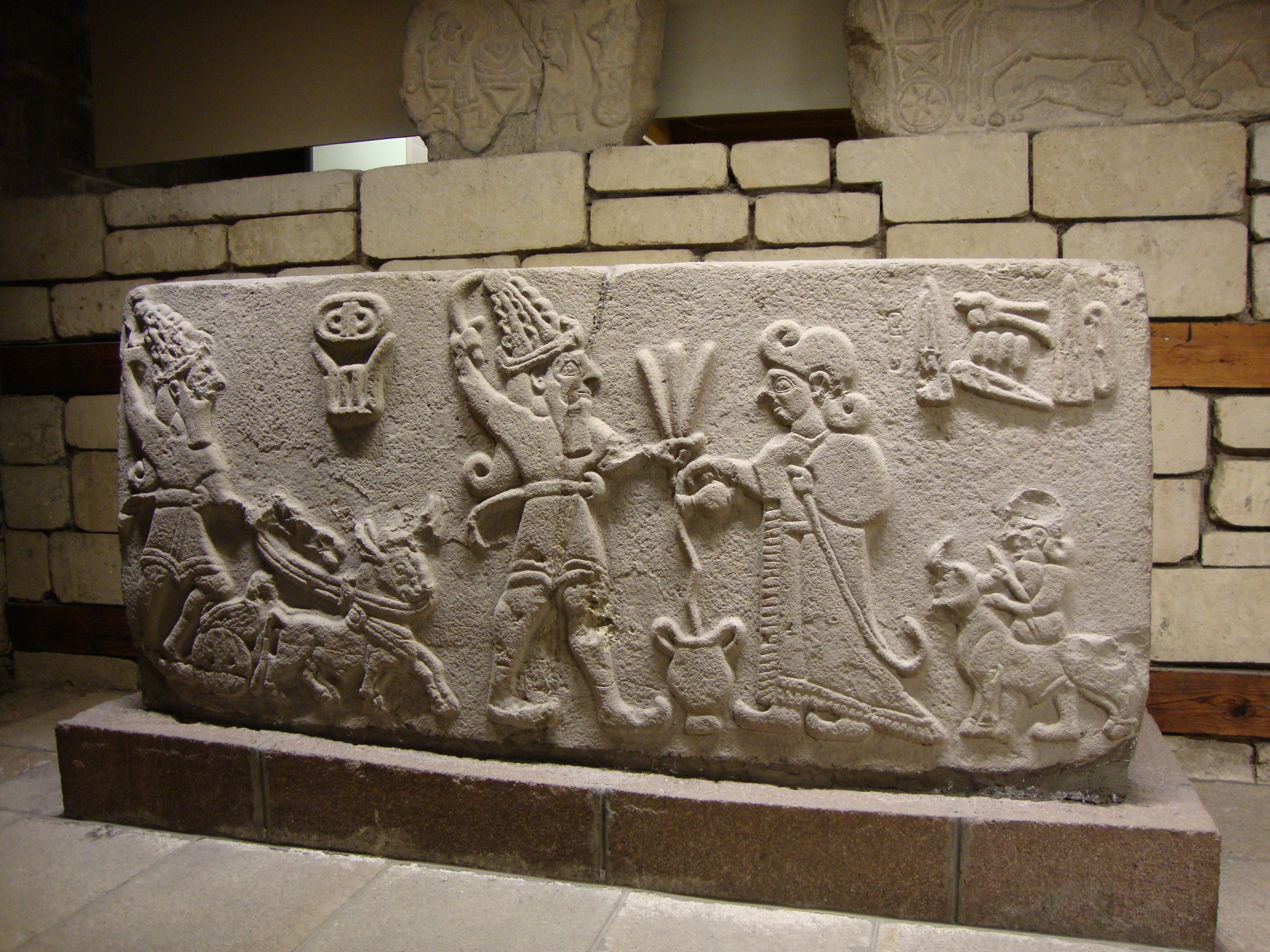
Hittite bas relief from the ruins of Arslantepe at Museum of Anatolian Civilizations in Ankara.

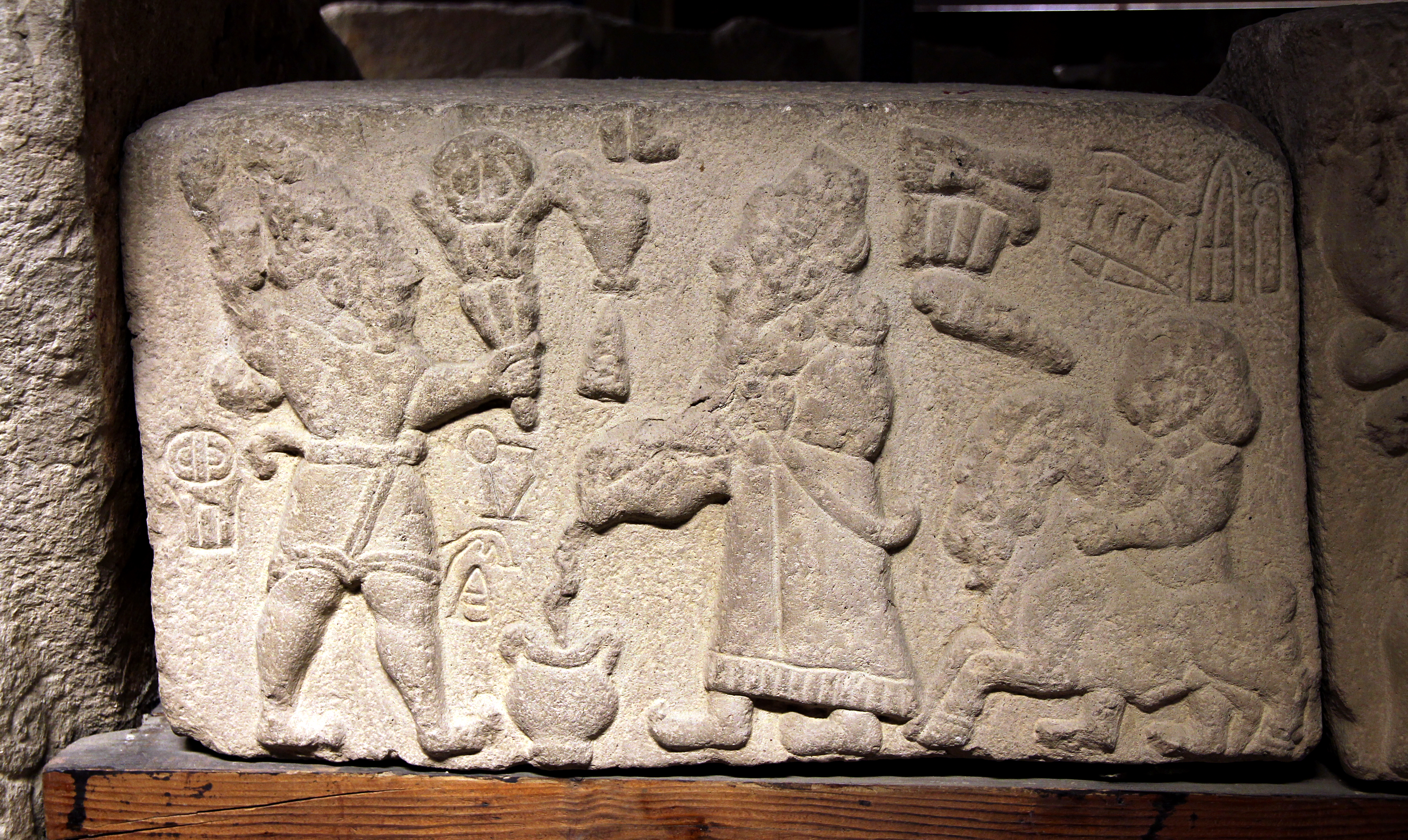
Hittite king offering libation to a Storm god, orthostat (12th century BCE).

=== Late Chalcolithic ===
The earliest habitation at the site dates back to the Chalcolithic period.

Arslantepe (VII; LC 3-4): It became important in this region in the Late Chalcolithic. A monumental area with a huge mudbrick building stood on top of a mound. This large building had wall decorations; its function is uncertain.

Arslantepe (VIA; LC 5): By the late Uruk period development had grown to include a large temple/palace complex. By the end of the period it was destroyed.

=== Early Bronze ===
Numerous similarities have been found between these early layers at Arslantepe, and the somewhat later site of Birecik (Birecik Dam Cemetery), also in Turkey, to the southwest of Melid.

Around 3000 BC, the transitional EBI-EBII, there was widespread burning and destruction of the previous significant Uruk-oriented settlement. After this Kura–Araxes pottery appeared in the area. This was a mainly pastoralist culture connected with the Caucasus mountains. Settlement in this period appears to have been local in nature but influenced by Kura–Araxes culture.

On the other hand, according to Martina Massimino (2023), the connections of this tomb with the Maikop-Novosvobodnaya kurgans are quite clear based on architecture and the metalwork. The exact chronology and sequence of these events still remain to be clarified.

=== Middle Bronze Age ===
Melid is notably absent from the list of major Assyrian administrative hubs (Assyrian Trade Network). The primary Assyrian routes typically crossed the Euphrates further south.

=== Late Bronze Age ===
In the Late Bronze Age, the site became an administrative center of a larger region in the kingdom of Isuwa. The city was heavily fortified, probably due to the Hittite threat from the west. It was culturally influenced by the Hurrians, Mitanni and the Hittites.

Around 1350 BC, Šuppiluliuma I of the Hittites conquered Melid in his war against Tushratta of Mitanni. At the time Melid was a regional capital of Isuwa at the frontier between the Hittites and the Mitanni; it was loyal to Tushratta. Suppiluliuma I used Melid as a base for his military campaign to sack the Mitanni capital Washukanni.

=== Iron Age ===
After the end of the Hittite empire, from the 12th to 7th century BC, the city became the center of an independent Luwian Neo-Hittite state of Kammanu, also known as 'Malizi'. A palace was built and monumental stone sculptures of lions and the ruler erected.

In the 12th century, Melid was probably dependent on Karkemiš, where king Kuzi-Tešub ruled. His two grandsons, Runtyas (Runtiya) and Arnuwantis, were at first appointed as "Country Lords" of Melid, but later they also became kings of Melid.

The encounter with the Assyrian king Tiglath-Pileser I (1115–1077 BC) resulted in the kingdom of Melid being forced to pay tribute to Assyria. Melid remained able to prosper until the Assyrian king Sargon II (722–705 BC) sacked the city in 712 BC. At the same time, the Cimmerians and Scythians invaded Anatolia and the city declined.

== Archaeology ==
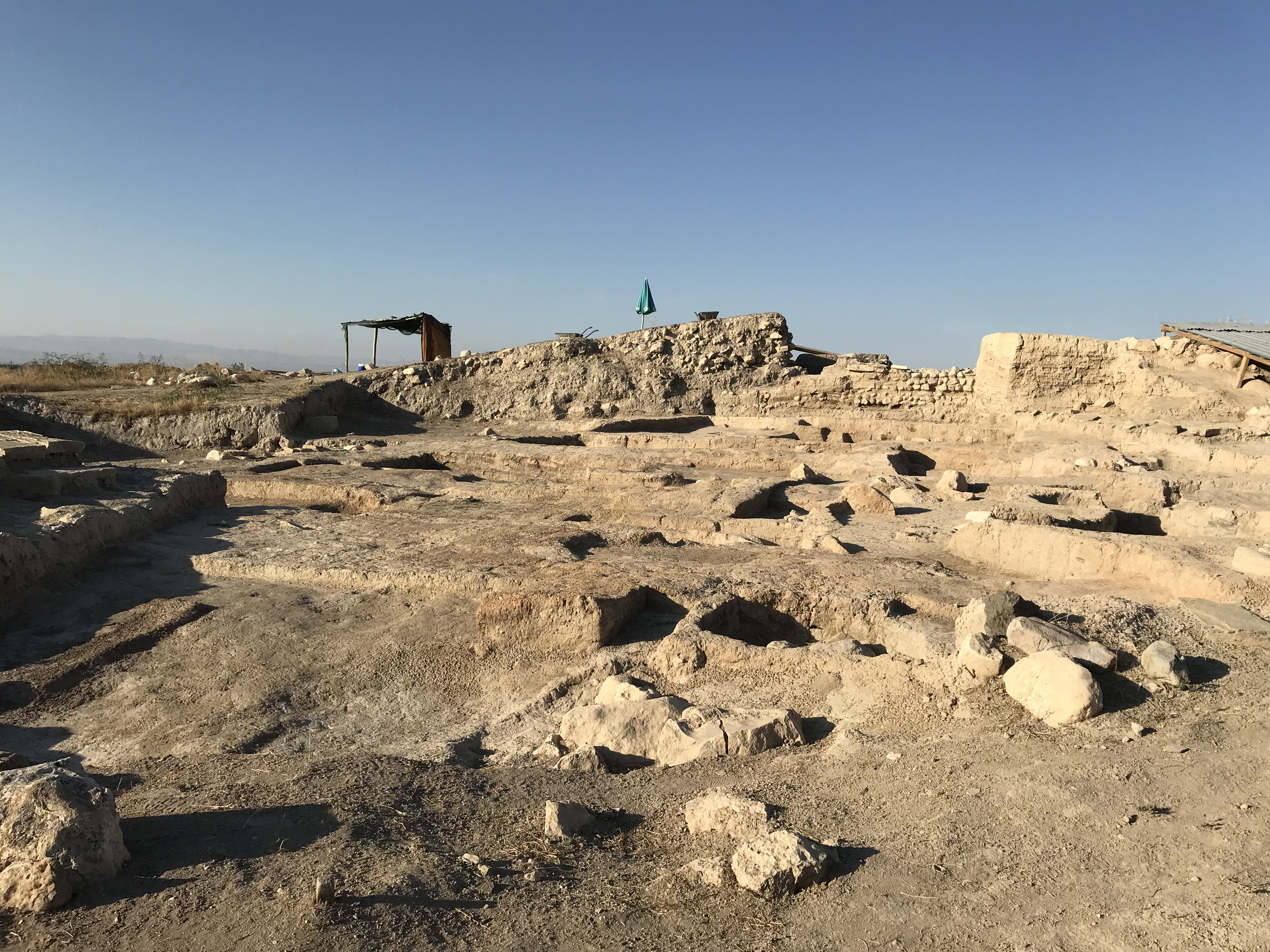
Arslantepe Ruins, Malatya

Arslantepe covers an area of about 4 hectares and rises to about 30 meters above the plain. The site was visited by Gertrude Bell and Hansen van der Osten in the earliest part of the 20th century. It was first investigated by the French archaeologist Louis Delaporte from 1932 to 1939, focusing on the Neo-Hittite remains in the northwest section of the mounds slope. From 1946 to 1951 Claude F.A. Schaeffer focused on site stratigraphy cutting deep trenches across the top of the mound. The results were never published.

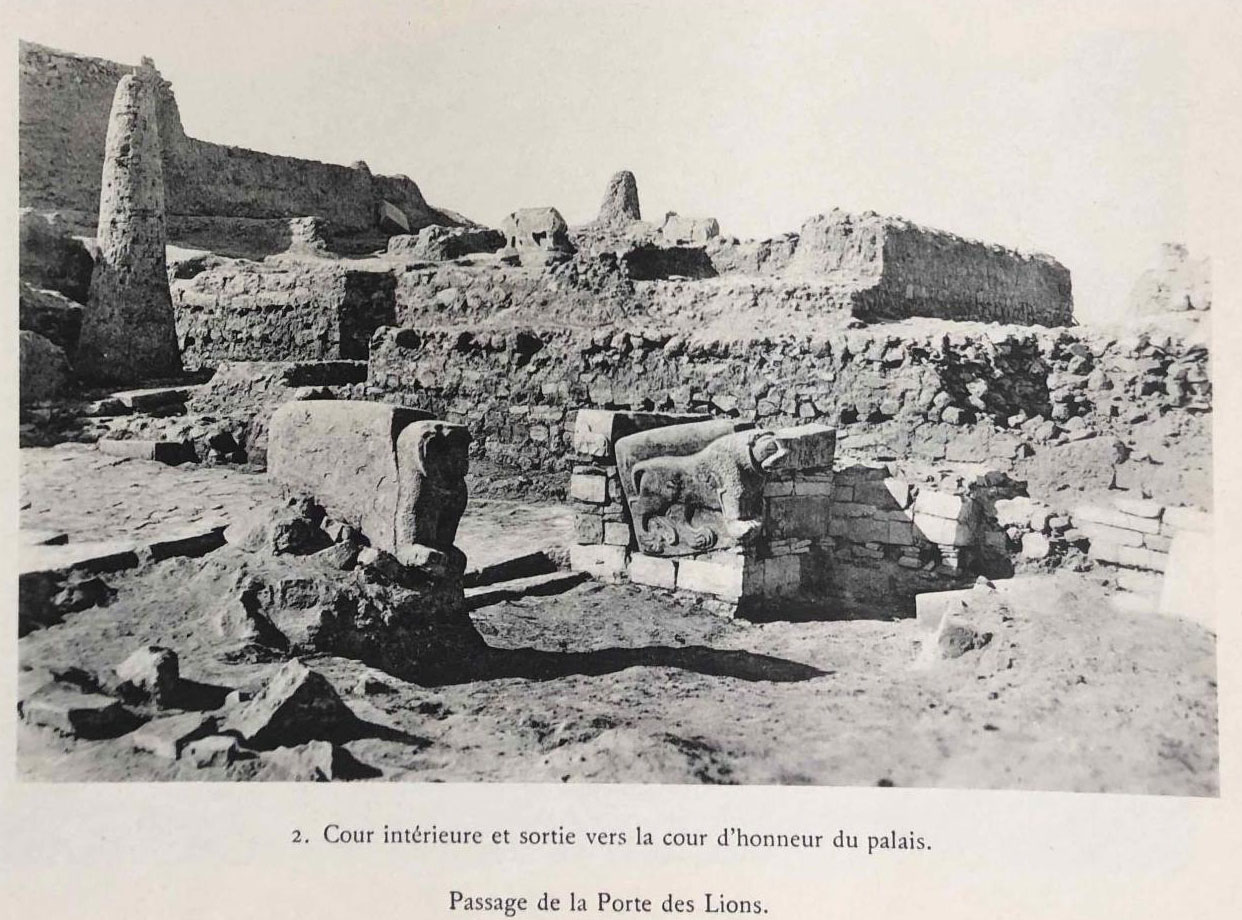
Arslantepe's lion gate in 1940

The first Italian excavations at the site of Arslantepe started in 1961, and were conducted by a Sapienza University of Rome team under the direction of Professors Piero Meriggi and Salvatore M. Puglisi until 1968. The Hittitologist Meriggi only took part in the first few campaigns and later left the direction to Puglisi, a palaeoethnologist, who expanded and regularly conducted yearly investigations under regular permit from the Turkish government. Alba Palmieri took over the supervision of the excavation during the 1970s. In the early 21st century, the archaeological investigation was conducted by a Sapienza University of Rome team led by Marcella Frangipane. Beginning in 2008, excavations focused on the Late Bronze and Iron Age areas of the site.

A few shards of Halaf period pottery were found and in Level VIII (early 4th millennium BC) there was a modest, village type Late Ubaid settlement. In Level VII (LC 4, Middle Uruk) an isolated monumental building was found and the settlement grew to cover the entire mound. Over time elite residences were built nearby. In Level VIA (LC 5, Late Uruk) four monumental buildings, terraced and largely interconnected, were constructed on the site of the Middle Uruk building. Two have been identified as temples (Temple A and Temple B) while the others (Building III and Building IV) are of unknown functions. Butted metal spearheads were found in Building III. A large number of vases and clay sealings were found in the temples. Most settlements formed as part of the Uruk Expansion, such as Jebel Aruda, Tell Sheikh Hassan, and Habuba Kabira, were abandoned at the end of the Late Chacolothic 5 period and anything of note removed, leaving little for archaeologists but walls and bits of pottery and clay sealings. Arslantepe was violently destroyed at the end of LC 5 leaving a number of small finds in situ. As at other middle and late Uruk period sites, despite extensive excavation no Uruk period burials were found.

In Level VIB1, at the beginning of the 3rd millennium BC, a large cist burial was found, traditionally called the "Royal Tomb" amongst an otherwise low level settlement consisting of light wooden structures along with one mudbrick structure (Building 36) which appeared to be out of use at the time the tomb was built. Building 36 had one meter thick walls on stone foundations and one terracotta cylinder seal and one stone stamp-seal were found, possibly heirlooms and two copper butted spearheads. Pottery in the level was a mix of local and Kura-Araxes traditions. It has been suggested that the tomb was constructed during a period of abandonment at the end of Level VIB1. The tomb contained two adolescent human sacrifices (adorned with metal ornaments) and the primary body was buried with high status grave goods, mostly metal but including carnelian and rock crystal beads. Originally considered an isolated exemplar similar related tombs were found at places like Hassek Höyük and Bashur Höyük.

The excavators have defined a number of occupation levels and sublevels:

- I - Late Roman 100-400 AD
- II-III - Iron Age 1100-700 BC Hittite New Kingdom + Neo-Assyrian
- IV - Late Bronze II 1600-1100 BC Hittite Middle Kingdom
- VB - Late Bronze I 1750-1600 BC Hittite Old Kingdom
- VA - Middle Bronze 2000-1750 BC Assyrian Karum period
- VID - Early Bronze Age III 2500-2000 BC Early-Dynastic III b
- VIC - Early Bronze Age II 2750-2500 BC Early-Dynastic II-III a
- VIB2 - Early Bronze Age I 2900-2750 BC Jemdet Nasr
- VIB1 - Early Bronze Age I 3000-2900 BC Jemdet Nasr
- Destroyed in a violent conflagration
- VIA - Late Chalcolithic 5 3350-3000 BC Late Uruk
- VII - Late Chalcolithic 3-4 3800-3350 BC Early and Middle Uruk
- VIII - Late Chalcolithic 1-2 4250-3800 BC Late Ubaid

Level V1B was radiocarbon dated to 2885 BC.

== Early swords and metal trade ==
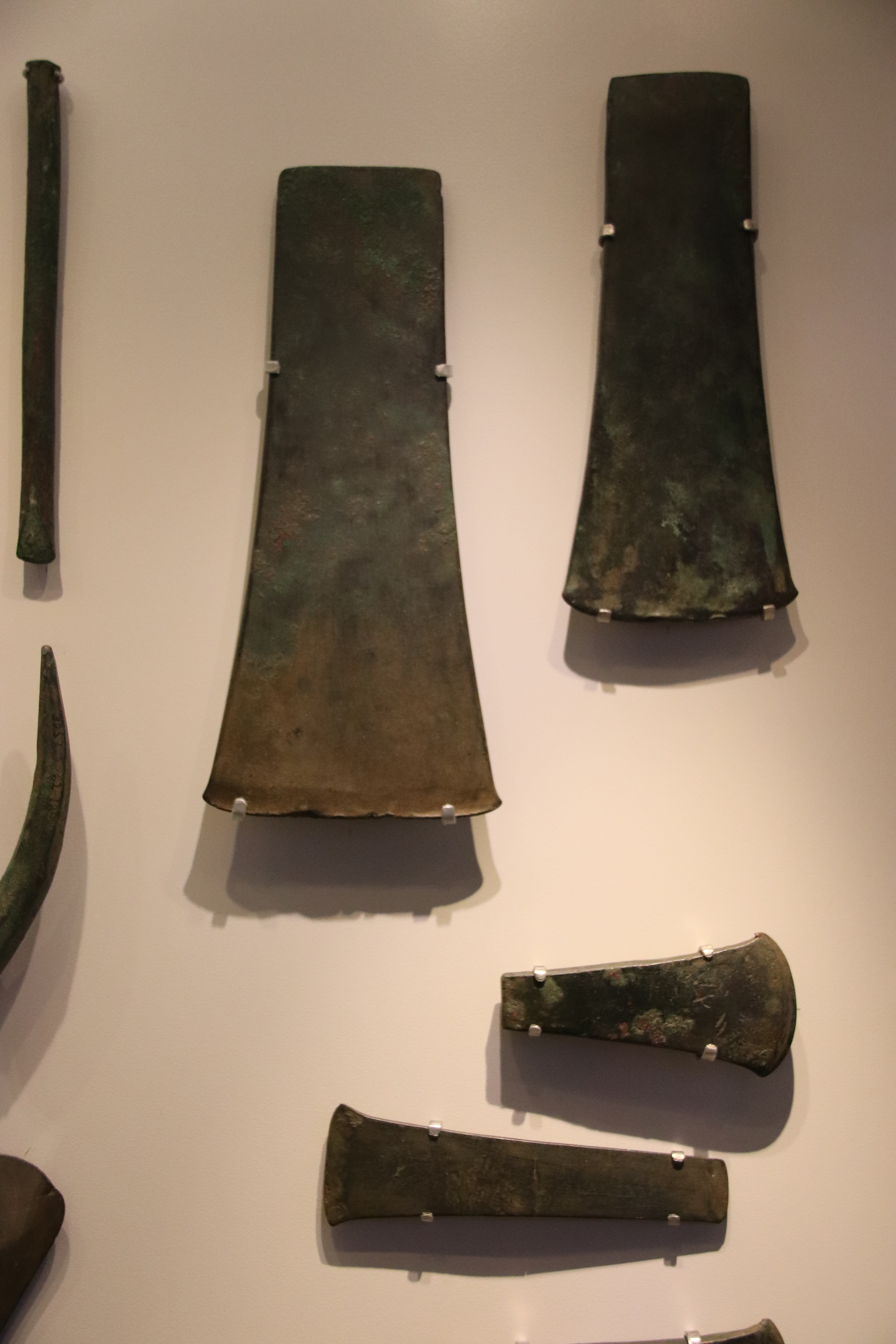
Egyptian type copper axes, Kfar Monash Hoard. Israel Museum, Jerusalem. These axes were made using copper–arsenic–nickel alloy that probably originated in Arslantepe area

The first swords known so far date to ca. the 33rd to 31st centuries BCE, during the Early Bronze Age, and have been founds at Arslantepe by Marcella Frangipane of Sapienza University of Rome. A cache of nine swords and daggers was found; they are cast from an arsenic–copper alloy. Analysis of two swords showed a copper/arsenic composition of 96%/3.15% and 93%/2.65%. Two daggers tested at copper/arsenic 96%/3.99% and 97%/3.06% with a third at copper/silver composition of 50%/35% with a trace of arsenic. Among them, three swords were beautifully inlaid with silver. These objects were found in the "hall of weapons" in the area of the palace.

These weapons have a total length of 45 to 60 cm which suggests their description as either short swords or long daggers.

These discoveries were made back in the 1980s. They belong to the local phase VI A. Also, 12 spearheads were found. These objects were dated to the period VI A (3400-3200 BC). Phase VI A at Arslantepe ended in destruction—the city was burned.

Kfar Monash Hoard was found in 1962 in Israel. Among the many copper objects in it, "Egyptian type" copper axes were found. These axes were made using copper-arsenic-nickel (CuAsNi) alloy that probably originated in Arslantepe area. Objects from Arslantepe using such polymetallic ores are mainly ascribed to Level VIA (3400–3000 BCE), dating to the Uruk period.

The next Phases or periods were VI B1 and VI B2. This is the time to which the other big discovery at Arslantepe belongs. This is the rich "Royal Tomb" where high quality pottery, and a large number of refined metal objects, made with several kinds of copper based alloys, were found. A sword was also found in the tomb. This tomb is also known as the tomb of "Signor Arslantepe", as he was called by archaeologists. He was about 40 years old, and the tomb is radiocarbon dated to 3085–2900 Cal. BC.

This "Royal Tomb" dates to the beginning of period VI B2, or perhaps even earlier to period VI B1. There's a considerable similarity between these two groups of objects in the "hall of weapons", and in the "Royal Tomb", and the times of manufacture of some of them must have been pretty close together.

=== Expansion of Kura–Araxes and trade in ores ===
Arslantepe probably participated in the metal and ore trade between the areas north and south. To the north were the metal-rich areas of the Black Sea coast; ores and metals from there were traded to Upper Mesopotamia in the south. Already during the older Arslantepe VII period, metal objects could be found with a signature of ores from near the Black Sea coast.

Also some of the metal artefacts from the "Royal Tomb" clearly belong to Kura–Araxes culture manufacturing traditions, and the metal analysis even shows provenance from northern Caucasus. All this indicates that the expansion of Kura–Araxes culture to wider areas may have been prompted in part by a trade of ores and metals.

Nevertheless, according to Martina Massimino (2023), the widespread metal trade was rather conducted by the Maikop-Novosvobodnaya kurgans group which constructed the big chiefly tomb at Arslantepe. According to her, the recent excavations at Basur Hoyuk in Turkey indicate the presence of the same group there, and provide more evidence for this theory.

== See also ==
- Hattusa
- List of Neo-Hittite kings
- List of cities of the ancient Near East
- Chronology of the ancient Near East
