= Kummuh =

Neo-Hittite kingdom until 708 BC

Coordinates: 37°33′N 38°30′E

Kummuh Kummaḫa
- Unknown–708 BC
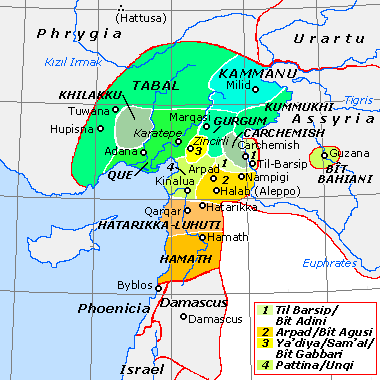
- Kummuh among the Neo-Hittite states
- Capital: Kummuh
- Common languages: Hieroglyphic Luwian
- Religion: Luwian religion
- Government: Monarchy
- Historical era: Iron Age
  - Established: Unknown
  - Disestablished: 708 BC
Preceded by	Succeeded by
Hittite empire	Neo-Assyrian Empire
- Today part of: Turkey

Kummuh was a Neo-Hittite kingdom in the Iron Age, located on the west bank of the Upper Euphrates within the eastern loop of the river between Melid (north) and Carchemish (south). The city is identified with the classical-period Samosata (modern-day Samsat Höyük), which has now been flooded under the waters of a newly built dam.

== Territory ==
Kummuh bordered the kingdoms of Melid to the north, Gurgum to the west and Carchemish to the south, while to the east it faced Assyria and later Urartu.

Other places that are mentioned in historical sources as lying within Kummuh are lands of Kištan and Helpi, and cities of Wita, Helpa, Parala, Sukiti and Sarita(?).

== History ==
=== Late Bronze ===
==== Hittite Period ====
From the Middle Hittite Period (15th century BCE) onwards, the Hittite archives of Hattuša refer to a city of Kummaha, which might be identical to the later city of Kummuh.

=== Iron Age ===
Kummuh and Samsat on the map of Neo-Hittite states (1000-800 BC)

Most of the information about Kummuh comes from Assyrian sources. From the beginning of the 9th to the middle of the 8th centuries, Kummuh seems to have remained a peaceful tributary state allied with Assyria.

Assyrian sources refer to both the land and its capital city by the same name. Urartian sources refer to it as Kummaha. The name is also attested in at least one local royal inscription dating to the 8th century BCE.

==== Assyrian Period ====
In 866 BCE, Kummuh king Qatazilu paid tribute to Assyrian king Ashurnasirpal II in the city of Huzirina (modern-day Sultantepe). In 858 BCE, Assyrian king Shalmaneser III reported in his Kurkh Monolith that Qatazilu submitted to him peacefully after the Assyrian king crossed the Euphrates on a campaign to the west. A similar report is mentioned for another campaign in 857. In 853 BCE, a new king in Kummuh, Kundašpi, was reported by Shalmaneser III as being among the northern Syrian kings who submitted to him in the city of Pitru.

In 805 BCE, as reported on the Pazarcık Stele, the Kummuh king Ušpilulume (Šuppiluliuma) asked for the assistance of the Assyrian king Adad-nirari III against the a coalition of eight kings led by Ataršumki of Arpad. Adad-nirari apparently travelled with his mother Šammuramat, defeated the alliance, and established the border between Kummuh and Gurgum at Pazarcık. In 773 BCE, the same boundary was re-established by Assyrian general (turtanu) Šamši-ilu acting on behalf of Assyrian king Shalmaneser IV. Around 750 BCE Kummuh was attacked by the Urartian king Sarduri II who captured the cities of Wita and Helpi, and made the Kummuh king Kuštašpi pay a tribute. In 743, BCE Kuštašpi was among the Urartu-Arpad alliance against Tiglath-pileser III of Assyria. The alliance was defeated but Tiglath-pileser III pardoned Kuštašpi along with the kings of Melid and Gurgum. Kuštašpi appears as a tributary of Tiglath-pileser III in 738 and 732.

In 712 BCE, after the Kingdom of Melid was dismembered by the Assyrian king Sargon II, the city of Melid itself was given to Kummuh king Muttallu. Several indigenous rock inscriptions have been found in the region, all written in Hieroglyphic Luwian, attesting to the continuity of Hittite traditions. In his annals, the Assyrian king Sargon II referred to the Kummuh ruler as 'Hittite', and several rulers of Kummuh bore the same names as famous Hittite kings of the 2nd millennium BCE: Hattušili(?), Šuppiluliuma, and Muwattalli (in Assyrian sources Qatazilu, Ušpilulume, and Muttallu, respectively).

In 708 BCE, Sargon II accused Muttallu of allying himself with Urartu and sent his army into Kummuh. According to the annals, Muttallu escaped but the royal family and the population was deported to Babylonia, and settlers from Bit-Yakin (in Babylonia) were brought to Kummuh. Thereafter the region became a province of Assyria and was under the jurisdiction of the turtanu of the left, whose seat of power was apparently the city of Kummuh.

After the Assyrian empire collapsed, a city of the name of Kimuhu, which is almost certainly Kummuh, appears in a conflict between Egyptians and Babylonians in 607–606 BCE. The Babylonian king Nabopolassar captured the city and stationed a garrison there, whereupon the Egyptian army under the command of Necho II laid siege to it and captured it after a four-month siege.

=== Classical Age ===
Kummuh later gave its name to the classical Commagene and Samsat.

== Kings of Kummuh ==
Kings	Assyrian contemporary
Qatazilu (Hattušili^{?})	Assurnasirpal II (884-859 BCE); Shalmaneser III (859-824 BCE)
Kundašpi	Shalmaneser III (859-824 BCE)
Ušpilulume (Šuppiluliuma)	Adad-nirari III (811-783 BCE); Shalmaneser IV (783-773 BCE)
Hattušili^{?}	? Ashur-Dan III (773-755 BCE) ? Ashur-nirari V (755-745 BCE)
Kuštašpi	? Ashur-nirari V (755-745 BCE); Tiglat-pileser III (745-727 BCE)
Mutallu (Muwattalli)	Sargon II (722-705 BCE)

== Inscriptions ==
Several monuments with Hieroglyphic Luwian inscriptions dating to the kingdom of Kummuh have been found in the region, as at Samsat, Ancoz, Boybeypınarı, Malpınarı and Adıyaman. The one found in Boybeypınarı is the longest and best preserved of them. It is made of several basalt blocks and dates to the reign of Šuppiluliuma. The Malpınarı inscription is carved on a natural rock cliff and dates to the reign of Hattušili, son of Šuppiluliuma. An improved reading of ANCOZ 5 mentions the pair "Hattušili and Šuppiluliuma, father and son" (as opposed to a father Šuppiluliuma and son Hattušili), which may suggest the existence of either a second Šuppiluliuma or second Hattušili.

== See also ==
- Ancient regions of Anatolia
