= Shalmaneser IV =

- King of Assyria

King of the Neo-Assyrian Empire
- Reign: 783–773 BC
- Predecessor: Adad-nirari III
- Successor: Ashur-dan III
- Died: 773 BC
- Spouse: Hama
- Akkadian: Salmānu-ašarēd
- Dynasty: Adaside dynasty
- Father: Adad-nirari III

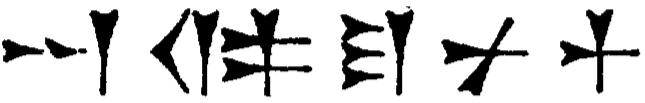
Shalmaneser IV (Neo-Assyrian cuneiform: Salmānu-ašarēd, meaning "Salmānu is foremost") was the king of the Neo-Assyrian Empire from 783 BC to his death in 773 BC. Shalmaneser was the son and successor of his predecessor, Adad-nirari III, and ruled during a period of Assyrian decline from which few sources survive. As such his reign, other than broad political developments, is poorly known. Shalmaneser's time was marked both by an increase in the power held by Assyrian officials relative to that of the king and Assyria's enemies growing increasingly powerful. Most of Shalmaneser's military efforts were spent warring against the Kingdom of Urartu in the north, which during this time was reaching the peak of its power.

== Biography ==
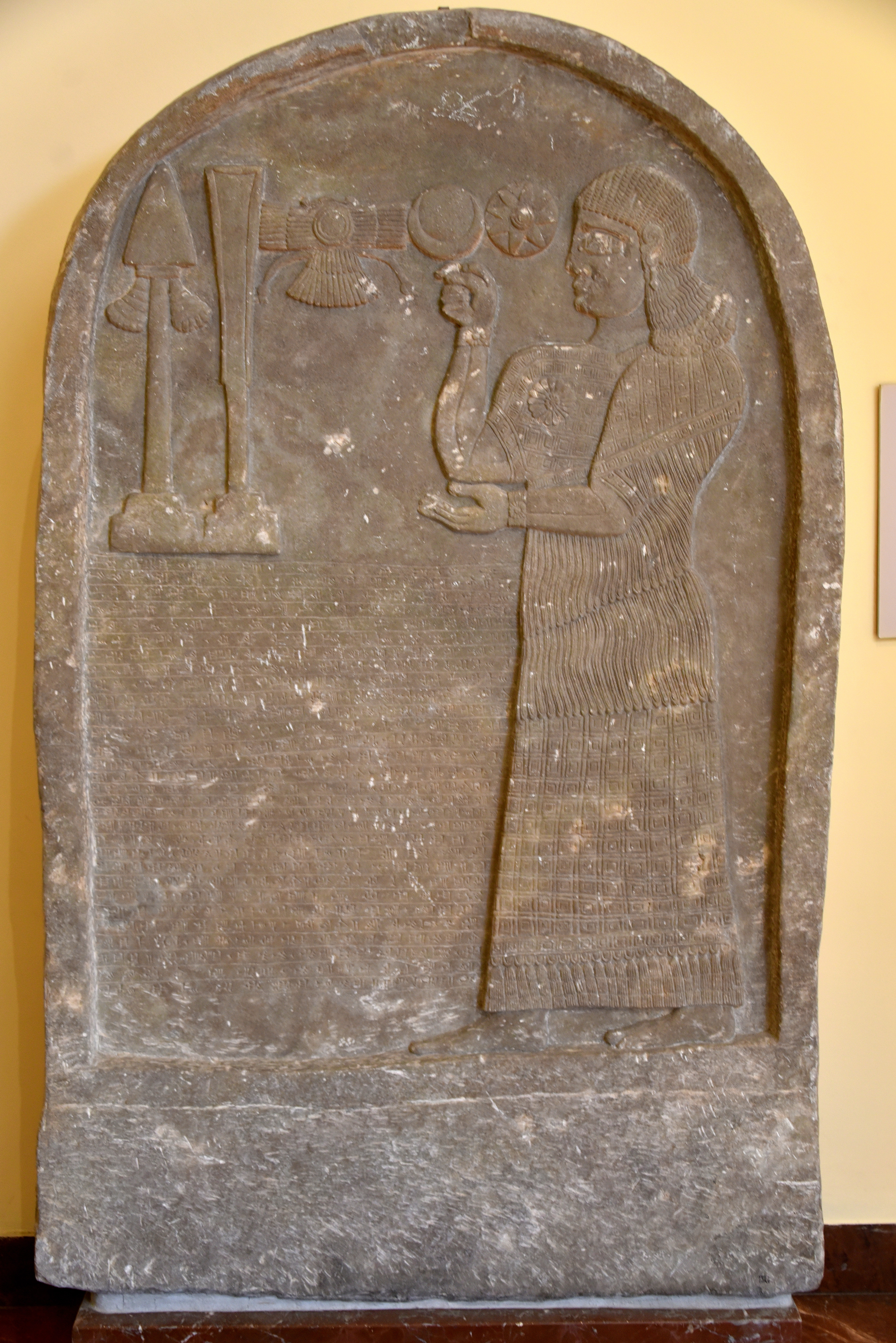
Stele of Bel-harran-beli-usur, an Assyrian palace herald, made during Shalmaneser IV's reign

Shalmaneser IV was the son and successor of Adad-nirari III (r. 811–783 BC), inheriting the throne upon his father's death in 783 BC. The accession of Shalmaneser IV marks the beginning of an obscure period in Assyrian history, from which little information survives. This period also extends throughout the reigns of his two immediate successors, his brothers Ashur-dan III (r. 773–755 BC) and Ashur-nirari V (r. 755–745/744 BC). By the end of Adad-nirari III's reign, the Neo-Assyrian Empire was declining. In particular, the power of the king himself was being threatened due to the emergence of extraordinarily powerful officials, whom while they accepted the authority of the Assyrian monarch in practice acted with supreme authority themselves and began to issue their own inscriptions, similar to those of the kings. This arrangement continued during the reign of Shalmaneser and his immediate successors, a time from which inscriptions from such officials are more common than inscriptions by the kings themselves. At the same time, the enemies of Assyria grew stronger and more serious. This period of Assyrian decline for instance coincided with the peak of the northern Kingdom of Urartu.

Only a small number of texts are known from Shalmaneser. No building projects are known from his time, though he is thought to have done some construction work in Assur, the first capital of Assyria. One inscription found near the city Marash in Turkey from 773 BC describes a border confirmation with Ušpilulume, king of Kummuh, made at some point after the conclusion of a campaign against Damascus. The inscription credits the influential general Shamshi-ilu with victory against Damascus and is ambiguous concerning whether it was Shamshu-ilu or Shalmaneser who negotiated with Ušpilulume. At Tell Abta, an archaeological site by Lake Tharthar, a stele has been found, written by the palace herald Bel-harran-beli-usur which describes the foundation of a new city in the desert. The stele unusually gives Bel-harran-beli-usur's name before the name of the incumbent king and also credits the foundation of the new city to him, not to Shalmaneser, indicating great autonomy. The inscription of the stele, which named the incumbent king as Shalmaneser, was at some point changed to instead refer to the later Tiglath-Pileser III (r. 745–727 BC).

Shalmaneser's queen was named Hama. They were married already during the reign of Adad-nirari, as an inscription by Adad-nirari identifies her as his daughter-in-law. Hama's tomb was identified in 2017 by Tracy L. Spurrier at Nimrud, the capital in Shalmaneser's time. Her skeleton indicates that she died very young, aged only 18–20, at some point during Shalmaneser's reign, though the cause of death could not be determined. Buried alongside her were various treasures, including a golden crown, jewelry, gems, gold bowls, bracelets, rings, brooches, pots, stamps, caps, leaves, cups and cylinder seals.

Inscriptions from after Shalmaneser's reign that mention him include the Assyrian King List (from which the length of his reign is known), a later royal decree, and a later list of eponyms (year names) that include the eponyms of Shalmaneser's reign. From the list of eponyms, it is known that Shalmaneser campaigned against Urartu from 781 to 776 BC. It is possible that a letter written to the god of Assyria, Ashur, from a king in the obscure time initiated by Shalmaneser IV refers to this campaign but it might alternatively have been written in the reign of his successor. Other campaigns of Shalmaneser recorded in the eponyms include a campaign against Ituʾa, probably a Babylonian city, in 776 BC, a 775 BC campaign to "the cedar mountain", a 774 BC campaign to Namri (in Urartu), and a final 774 BC campaign to Damascus. Though it appears that Shalmaneser's wars against Urartu were not decisive, his western campaigns, such as those against Damascus and presumably the cedar mountain, as well as the border confirmation with Ušpilulume illustrate some success in the west. It is probable that some, or perhaps even all, of the campaigns were actually led by Shamshi-ilu, rather than the king. Shalmaneser died in 773 BC and was succeeded by his brother, Ashur-dan III.

== Titles ==
In the inscription from Marash, Shalmaneser is accorded the following titulature:

Shalmaneser, strong king, king of Assyria, son of Adad-nirari, strong king, king of the Universe, king of Assyria, son of Shamshi-Adad, king of the Four Quarters.

Shalmaneser IV Adaside dynasty Died: 773 BC
Preceded by Adad-nirari III	King of Assyria; 783 – 773 BC	Succeeded by Ashur-dan III
