= Shamshi-Adad V =

King of Assyria

- King of Assyria; King of Sumer and Akkad; King of the Four Corners of the World
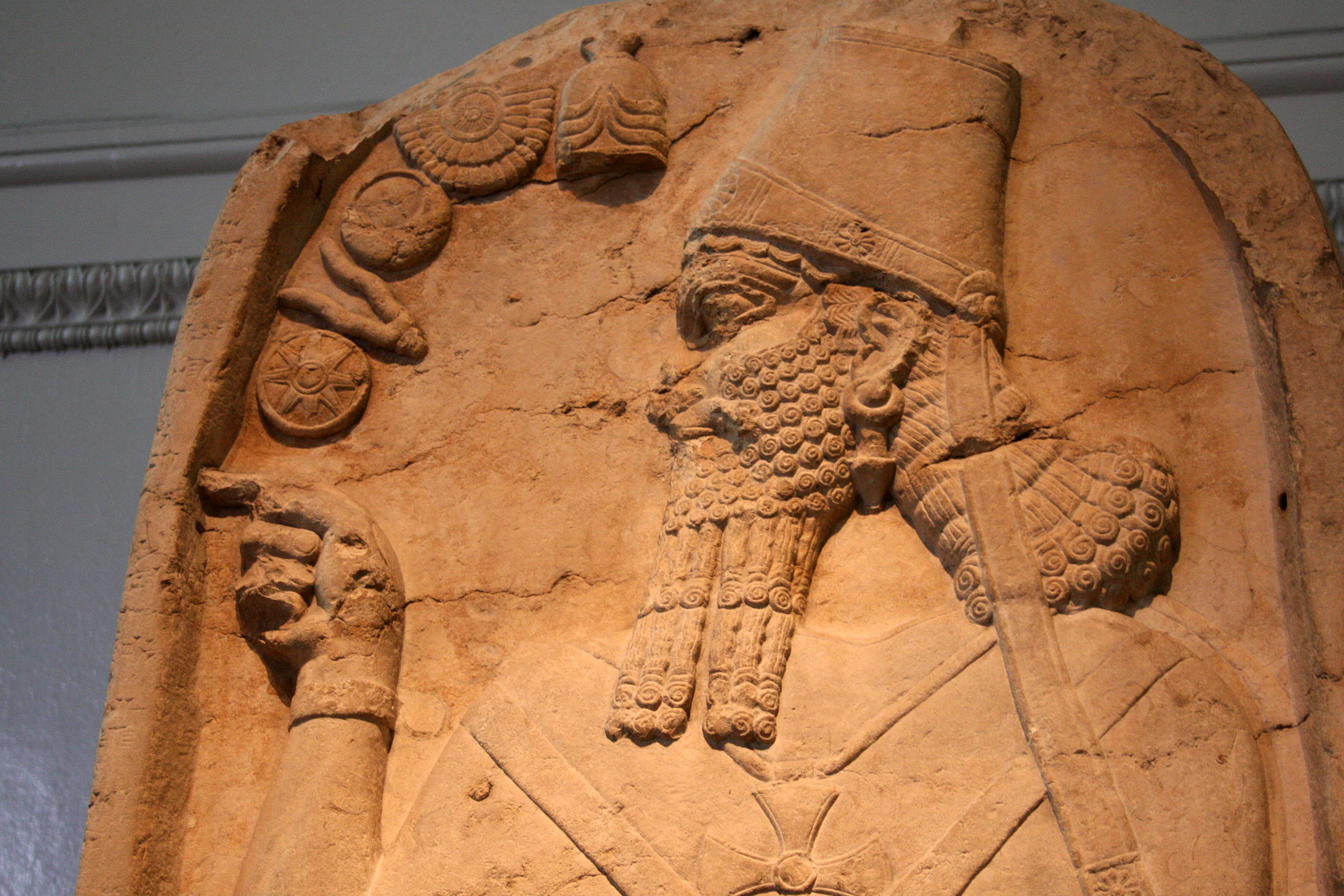
- Detail from a stele portraying Shamshi-Adad V in British Museum

King of the Neo-Assyrian Empire
- Reign: 824–811 BC
- Predecessor: Shalmaneser III
- Successor: Adad-Nirari III
- Died: 811 BC
- Spouse: Shammuramat
- Issue: Adad-Nirari III
- Father: Shalmaneser III

Shamshi-Adad V (Akkadian: Šamši-Adad) was the king of the Neo-Assyrian Empire from 824 to 811 BC. He was named after the god Adad, who is also known as Hadad.

== Family ==
Shamshi-Adad was a son and successor of King Shalmaneser III, the husband of Queen Shammuramat (by some identified with the mythical Semiramis), and the father of Adad-nirari III, who succeeded him as king.

He was also a grandfather of Shalmaneser IV.

== Reign ==
The first years of Shamshi-Adad's reign saw a serious struggle for the succession of the aged Shalmaneser.

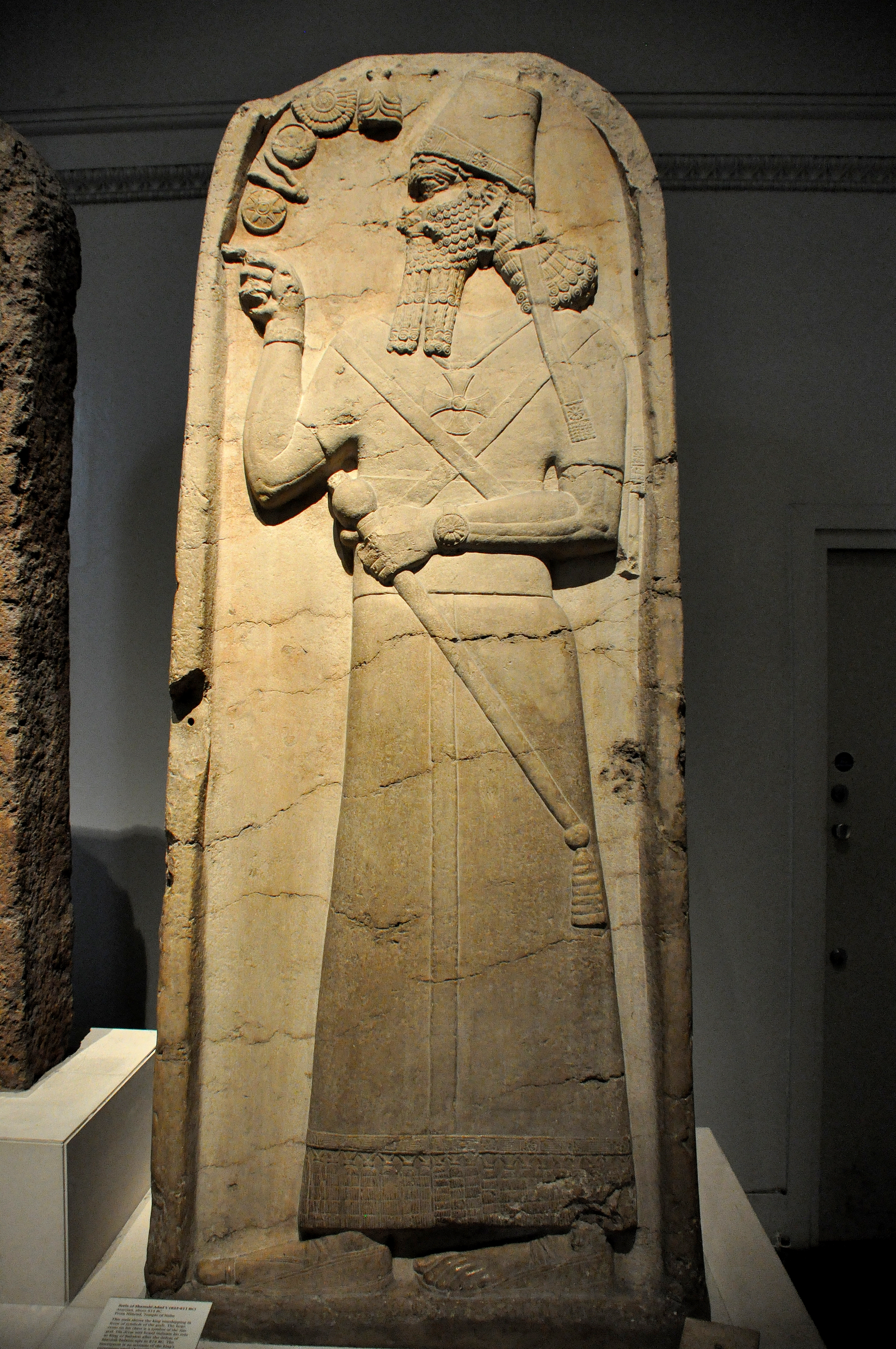
Stela of the Assyrian king Shamshi-Adad V from the temple of Nabu at Nimrud, Mesopotamia.

The revolt was led by Shamshi-Adad's brother Assur-danin-pal, and had broken out already by 826 BC. The rebellious brother, according to Shamshi-Adad's own inscriptions, succeeded in bringing to his side 27 important cities, including Nineveh. The rebellion lasted until 820 BC, weakening the Assyrian empire and its ruler; this weakness continued to reverberate in the kingdom until the reforms of Tiglath-Pileser III.

Later in his reign, Shamshi-Adad campaigned against Southern Mesopotamia, and stipulated a treaty with the Babylonian king Marduk-zakir-shumi I.

In 814 BC, he won the Battle of Dur-Papsukkal against the Babylonian king Marduk-balassu-iqbi, and a few Aramean tribes settled in Babylonia. The extent of Shamshi-Adad's victory was such that he obtained the submission of the Babylonian king and, after obtaining booty from several Babylonian cities, he returned to Assyria with palace treasures and gods (i.e. the sacred representation of the gods).

== See also ==
- Stela of Shamshi-Adad V

| Preceded by Shalmaneser III | King of Assyria; 824–811 BC | Succeeded by Adad-nirari III |
