= Tiglath-Pileser III =

8th-Century BCE Assyrian king, Neo-Assyrian Empire

- King of Assyria; King of Babylon; King of Sumer and Akkad; King of the Four Corners of the World; King of the Universe
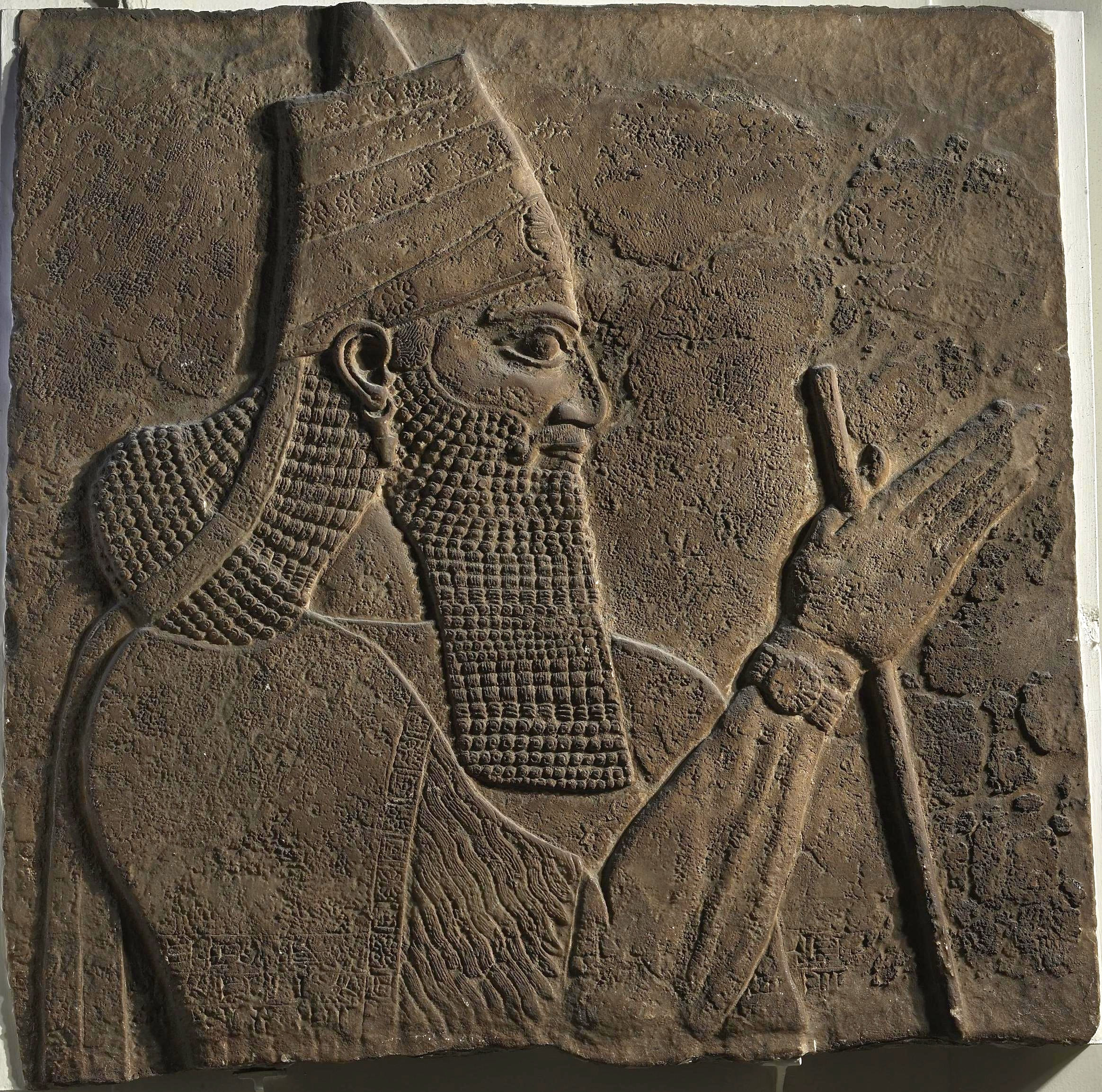
- Tiglath-Pileser III as depicted on a stele from the walls of his royal palace

King of the Neo-Assyrian Empire
- Reign: 745–727 BC
- Predecessor: Ashur-nirari V
- Successor: Shalmaneser V
- Born: c. 795 BC (Note: This estimate assumes Tiglath-Pileser was Adad-nirari III's son.) (?)
- Died: 727 BC (aged c. 68)
- Spouse: Iaba
- Issue: Shalmaneser V Sargon II (?); Sin-ahu-usur (?)
- Akkadian: Tukultī-apil-Ešarra
- Dynasty: Adaside dynasty
- Father: Adad-nirari III or Ashur-nirari V

Tiglath-Pileser III (Note: Sometimes alternatively spelled Tiglatpileser III. A handful of older sources erroneously number him as Tiglath-Pileser IV.) (Neo-Assyrian Akkadian: 𒆪𒋾𒀀𒂍𒈗𒊏, romanized: Tukultī-apil-Ešarra, meaning "my trust belongs to the son of Ešarra", (Note: Ešarra was a temple; the "son of Ešarra" refers to the god Ninurta, at this point viewed as the son of the Assyrian national deity Ashur.) Biblical Hebrew: תִּגְלַת פִּלְאֶסֶר, romanized: Tiglaṯ Pilʾeser, Old Aramaic: 𐤕𐤂𐤋𐤕𐤐𐤋𐤉𐤎𐤓, romanized: tgltplysr), sometimes called Pulu or Pul (see below), was the Neo-Assyrian emperor from 745 BC to his death in 727BC. One of the most prominent and historically significant Assyrian rulers, Tiglath-Pileser ended a period of Assyrian stagnation, introduced numerous political and military reforms, and doubled the lands under Assyrian control. He consolidated power and maintained control through the use of extraordinarily brutal and ruthless methods including impaling and mass dislocation. Because of the massive expansion and centralization of Assyrian territory and the establishment of a standing army, some researchers consider Tiglath-Pileser's reign to mark the actual transition of Assyria into an empire. The reforms and methods of control introduced under Tiglath-Pileser laid the groundwork for policies enacted not only by later Assyrian kings but also by later empires for millennia after his death.

The circumstances of Tiglath-Pileser's rise to the throne are not clear. Because ancient Assyrian sources give conflicting accounts concerning Tiglath-Pileser's lineage and there are records of a revolt around the time of his accession, many historians have concluded that Tiglath-Pileser was a usurper, who seized the throne from his predecessor Ashur-nirari V, who was either his brother or his father. Other historians postulate that the evidence could just as easily be interpreted as Tiglath-Pileser inheriting the throne through legitimate means, and the debate remains unresolved.

Tiglath-Pileser increased royal power and authority by curbing the influence of prominent officials and generals. After securing some minor victories in 744 and 743, he defeated the Urartian king Sarduri II in battle near Arpad in 743. This victory was significant since Urartu had briefly equalled Assyria in power; Sarduri had defeated Tiglath-Pileser's predecessor Ashur-nirari eleven years earlier.

After defeating Sarduri, Tiglath-Pileser turned his attention to the Levant. Over several years, he conquered most of the Levant, defeating and then either annexing or subjugating previously influential kingdoms, notably ending the kingdom of Aram-Damascus. Tiglath-Pileser's activities in the Levant were recorded in the Hebrew Bible. After a few years of conflict, Tiglath-Pileser conquered Babylonia in 729, becoming the first king to rule as sovereign of both Assyria and Babylonia.

== Background ==
=== Ancestry and rise to the throne ===
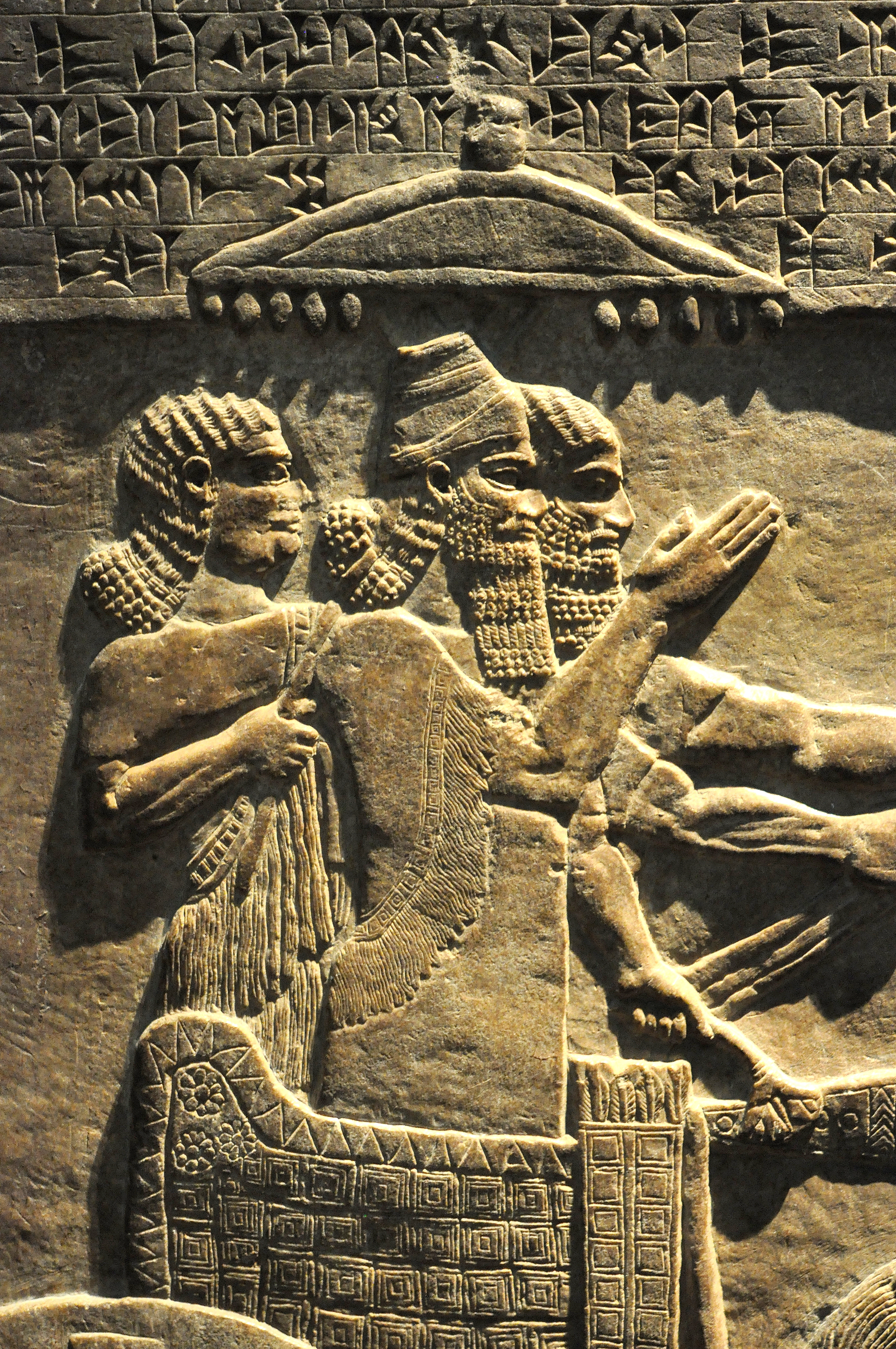
Tiglath-Pileser III, depicted in a royal chariot in one of the reliefs from the royal palace in Nimrud

There is not enough surviving evidence to conclude how Tiglath-Pileser III came to the throne and the nature of his accession is thus unclear and disputed. Several pieces of evidence indicate that he might have been a usurper. Pointing to this are the facts that there was a revolt in Nimrud, the capital of the Assyrian Empire, in 746/745 and that numerous officials and governors were replaced after 745. Ancient Assyrian sources give conflicting information in regards to Tiglath-Pileser's lineage. Tiglath-Pileser in inscriptions attributed his rise to the throne solely to divine selection, rather than the more typical practice of Assyrian kings ascribing their rise to both divine selection and his royal ancestry. The Assyrian King List, an ancient Assyrian document listing the kings of Assyria, states that Tiglath-Pileser's father was his immediate predecessor Ashur-nirari V. Tiglath-Pileser in his own inscriptions claimed that he was the son of Adad-nirari III, making him Ashur-nirari's brother.

Assyriologists and other historians have overwhelmingly concluded that Tiglath-Pileser was a usurper. The Assyriologist Bradley J. Parker went as far as suggesting that he was not part of the previous royal dynasty at all, but per the Assyriologist Karen Radner, his claims of royal descent were probably true, meaning that while he did usurp the throne, he was a legitimate contender for it, having been victorious in an intra-dynastic civil war. Tiglath-Pileser faced no known resistance or rebellions against his rule after taking the throne.

If accepted as a royal dynast, uncertainties still exist in whether Tiglath-Pileser was the son of Adad-nirari or Ashur-nirari. The Assyriologists Fei Chen, Albert Kirk Grayson and Shiego Yamada consider it more likely that he was Adad-nirari's son, with the Assyrian King List's identification of him as the son of Ashur-nirari possibly being a scribal error. The Assyriologist Paul Garelli considers this unlikely, given that 38 years separate the reign of Adad-nirari from that of Tiglath-Pileser, writing that the possibility of him being Ashur-nirari's son cannot be fully ruled out.

The historian Tracy Davenport holds that "we may never know" whether Tiglath-Pileser was Ashur-nirari's son or brother. There are ways to explain Tiglath-Pileser's inscriptions proclaiming him as the son of Adad-nirari despite the 38 years between their two reigns. It is possible that "son" in this context meant "grandson", meaning that Tiglath-Pileser would have been the son of Ashur-nirari or another of Adad-nirari's sons, or that Tiglath-Pileser actually was Adad-nirari's son, but came to the throne when he was already relatively old, possibly aged about 50.

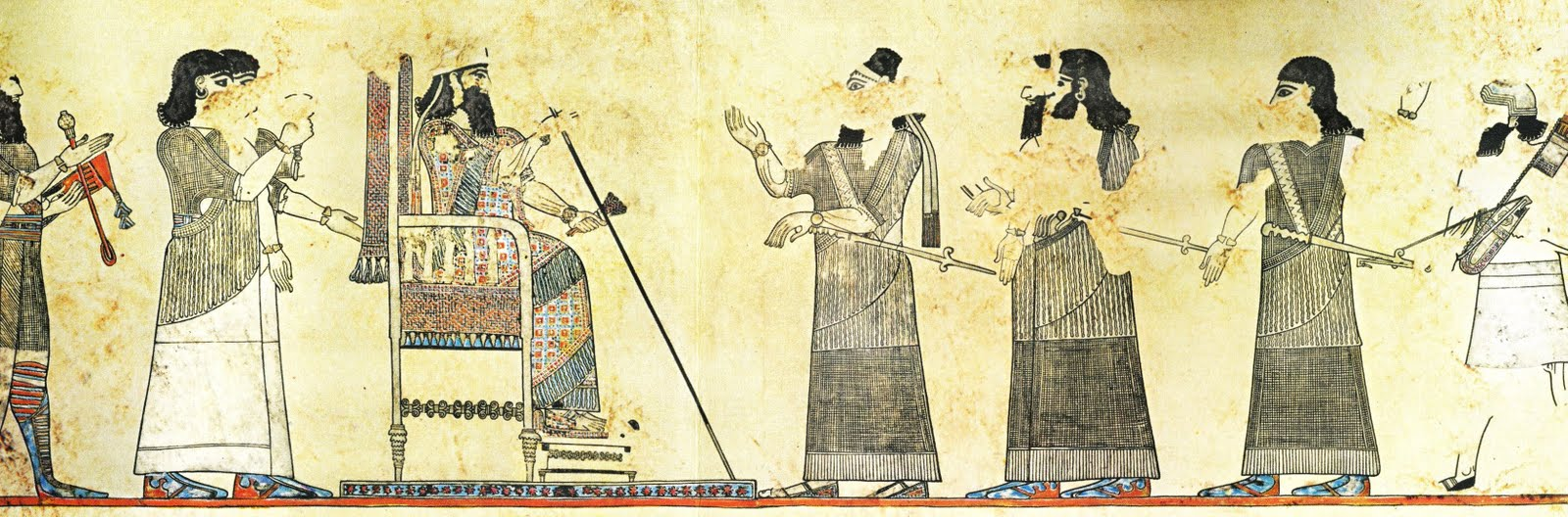
A wall painting from Til Barsip depicting Tiglath-Pileser (sitting) holding court. The official closest to him to the right is his son Shalmaneser V.

The Eponym Chronicle, a list of eponyms, names for the years, typically taken from influential officials, of Assyria confirms there was a revolt in Nimrud the year before Tiglath-Pileser became king. According to the historian Stefan Zawadzki, writing in 1994, the eponyms also provide insight into how the transition from Ashur-nirari to Tiglath-Pileser might have happened. That Tiglath-Pileser took the throne the year after the uprising was interpreted by Zawadzki, and others, as firmly indicating that he took the throne as the result of a coup d'etat. Zawadzki believes the Eponym Chronicle further suggests that the rebellion, while not necessarily led by Tiglath-Pileser himself, was started with his knowledge and consent. The chief piece of evidence Zawadzki presents for this is that the revolt of 746 began in Nimrud and the first official appointed as eponym holder by Tiglath-Pileser (in 744) was Bel-dan, the governor of Nimrud.

Garelli believes the revolt in 746 was instigated by Shamshi-ilu, a prominent official throughout the reigns of Tiglath-Pileser's predecessors, and that the uprising was crushed by Tiglath-Pileser after he legitimately inherited the throne. Zawadzki believes Shamshi-ilu may have revolted, as he is no longer recorded in Tiglath-Pileser's reign, but that the uprising in Nimrud was a separate revolt from Shamshu-ilu's supposed uprising and that Tiglath-Pileser or his supporters would have fought both Shamshu-ilu and Ashur-nirari.

In her 2016 PhD thesis, the historian Tracy Davenport advanced the theory that Tiglath-Pileser might have been entirely legitimate and that he could even have co-ruled with Ashur-nirari for some time. Supporting Garelli's idea that Tiglath-Pileser was not responsible for any rebellion and the idea that he was a member of the royal dynasty, Davenport examined the Eponym Chronicle. Notably, the eponyms for Tiglath-Pileser's early reign do not follow the traditional sequence used for Assyrian eponym holders. Typically, the king was eponym holder in his second regnal year, followed by important magnates and then provincial governors.

If Tiglath-Pileser became king in 745, the eponym holder of his second regnal year was Bel-dan, not the king himself, who was the eponym holder in 743, his third regnal year. This could be explained by Tiglath-Pileser not having become the sole ruler of Assyria until 744. There are some strange features of the Eponym Chronicle that suggest that Ashur-nirari ruled until 744, together with Tiglath-Pileser 745–744. There are two horizontal lines in this part of the list, one beneath 746, possibly marking Tiglath-Pileser's rise to the throne, and one beneath 744, possibly marking Ashur-nirari's death.

It is unlikely that the second line is an error, since it occurs right after a note that records the end of Ashur-nirari's reign and its length. Both the Eponym Chronicle and the Assyrian King List gives Ashur-nirari a reign length of 10 years, only possible if he ruled until 744, and not 745. If Ashur-nirari did rule until 744, it is unlikely that there was a civil war, since Tiglath-Pileser is recorded to have gone on campaigns against Assyria's foreign enemies in this time, not possible if he was simultaneously involved in internal conflict.

=== Name ===
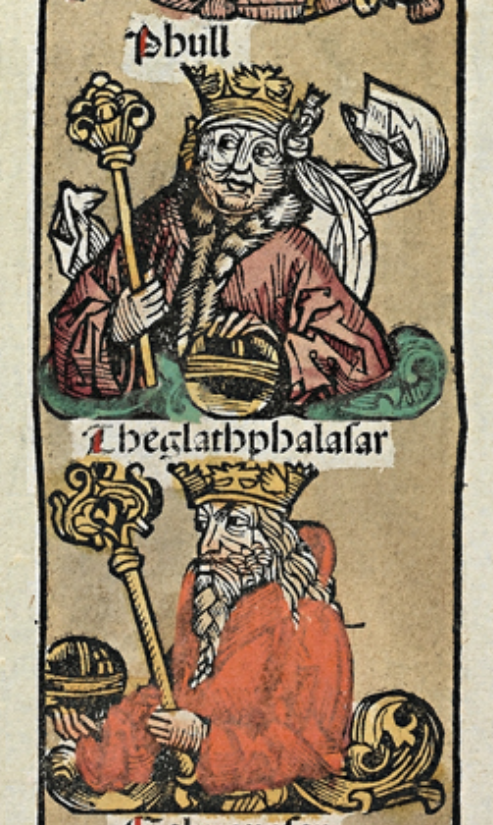
Kings Phull and Theglathphalasar in the 1493 Nuremberg Chronicle, which confuses Tiglath-Pileser and Pulu (Pul) as two different kings

Assyria was known for centuries primarily through its appearances in the Hebrew Bible. Mesopotamian rulers mentioned in the Bible are thus known today by the Biblical forms of their names. The modern name Tiglath-Pileser therefore derives from the Hebrew version of the name, which is a corrupted form of the original form, Tukultī-apil-Ešarra. Presumably a regnal name, adopted upon his accession to the throne, Tukultī-apil-Ešarra means "my trust belongs to the son of Ešarra." The Ešarra was a temple dedicated to the god Ninurta (who was thus the "son of Ešarra"). By the time of Tiglath-Pileser's reign, Ninurta was viewed as the son of the Assyrian national deity Ashur.

In some non-contemporary sources, such as the Canon of Kings, the Babylonian King List, the Bible and the works of later Babylonian and Greco-Roman historians, Tiglath-Pileser is recorded under the name Pul or Pulu (Pūlu, 𒁍𒇻), the etymology of which is uncertain. Though sometimes interpreted as a second regnal name, there are no contemporary Assyrian or Babylonian sources that refer to Tiglath-Pileser by this name and there is no evidence that it was ever used officially. No evidence exists of any Assyrian king ever using more than one regnal name in their lifetime.

In 2007, the trilingual Incirli inscription was published, providing contemporary confirmation that Pul (Pulu) and Tiglath-Pileser III were the same individual. Only the Phoenician language part of the inscription has been published so far because of the monument's poor state of preservation. Still, the identification of Tiglath-Pileser III as Pul is reasonably sure because this phrase is repeated more than once in the text. The Phoenician spelling of this name is Puwal.

Tiglath-pileser III is also referred to as Puˀ/wal [Puwal] with an intervocalic glide, spelled פאל quite clearly in at least one place (and probably the others) in contrast to biblical פול, vocalized Pûl. If it were pronounced according to the latter then one would expect פל in the Phoenician orthography."

The Phoenician inscription is narrated in the first person by king Awarikus (Awarikku, Warika, Urikki) of Quwê, who is known from other ancient inscriptions. His stele was erected to mark the land given to Awariku by Tiglath-Pileser III. He is also known as the King of the Danaans, or the "Danunean king". He also describes himself as 'the King of the dynasty of Mopsos'.

Some Assyriologists, such as Eckart Frahm and Paul-Alain Beaulieu, have speculated that Pulu was Tiglath-Pileser's original name before he became king and assumed his regnal name or perhaps a nickname.

According to Gerard Gertoux, Tiglath-Pileser III was the son of Adad-nīrārī III and used the name Pulu as a young co-regent under previous kings. When he won the kingship of Babylon, for the last two years of his life, this again became his official name in Babylon. Gertoux explains the derivation of this name as a hypocoristic use of the word aplu “the heir”.

=== Assyria before Tiglath-Pileser ===
Assyria first rose as a prominent state under the Middle Assyrian Empire in the 14th century BC, previously only having been a city-state centered on the city of Assur. From the 12th century BC onwards, the Middle Assyrian Empire entered into a period of decline, becoming increasingly restricted to just the Assyrian heartland itself. Though the decline was at times halted by energetic warrior-kings, reconquests were not lasting until the time of Ashur-dan II (r. 934–912 BC), who campaigned in the northeast and northwest. The accession of Ashur-dan's son Adad-nirari II (r. 911–891 BC) traditionally marks the beginning of the Neo-Assyrian Empire.

Under the early Neo-Assyrian kings, there was a gradual reconquest of former Assyrian lands. The success of this project was an extraordinary achievement given that the kings essentially had to rebuild the Assyrian Empire from scratch. Under Ashurnasirpal II (r. 883–859 BC) the Neo-Assyrian Empire rose to become the dominant political power in the ancient Near East. Ashurnasirpal's son Shalmaneser III (r. 859–824 BC) further expanded Assyrian territory but his enlarged domain proved difficult to stabilize and his last few years initiated a renewed period of stagnation and decline, marked by both external and internal conflict.

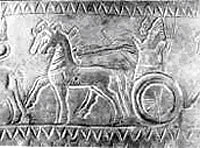
Sarduri II of Urartu, a prominent adversary of Assyria

The most important problems facing Shalmaneser late in his reign were the rise of the kingdom of Urartu in the north and the increasing political authority and influence of the "magnates", a set of influential Assyrian courtiers and officials. The rise of Urartu threatened Assyrian hegemony since submission to Urartu was viewed by many vassal states as a realistic alternative to Assyria. The Urartian administration, culture, writing system and religion closely followed those of Assyria. The Urartian kings were also autocrats highly similar to the Assyrian kings. The imperialist expansionism undertaken by the kings of both Urartu and Assyria led to frequent military clashes between the two, despite being separated by the Taurus Mountains.

For a brief time, the Urartian army equalled that of Assyria; though the Assyrians scored many victories against Urartu, notably plundering Urartu's heartland late in Shalmaneser's reign, the Urartians scored victories of their own. In 754, the Urartian king Sarduri II defeated the Assyrian army under Ashur-nirari V at Arpad, an event that may have led to the Assyrian army not campaigning for several years. The Assyrian kings were unable to deal with external threats since the magnates had gradually become the dominant political actors and central authority had become very weak.

The reigns of Tiglath-Pileser's three predecessors Shalmaneser IV (r. 783–773 BC), Ashur-dan III (r. 773–755 BC) and Ashur-nirari V was the low point of Assyrian royal power. In Shalmaneser IV's reign, the turtanu (commander-in-chief) Shamshi-ilu was bold enough to credit military victories to himself rather than the king. Ashur-nirari V appears to have been relatively idle as a ruler. He campaigned only three times, staying in Assyria throughout the majority of his reign, and he is not known to have conducted any building projects.

== Reign ==
=== Reforms and policies ===
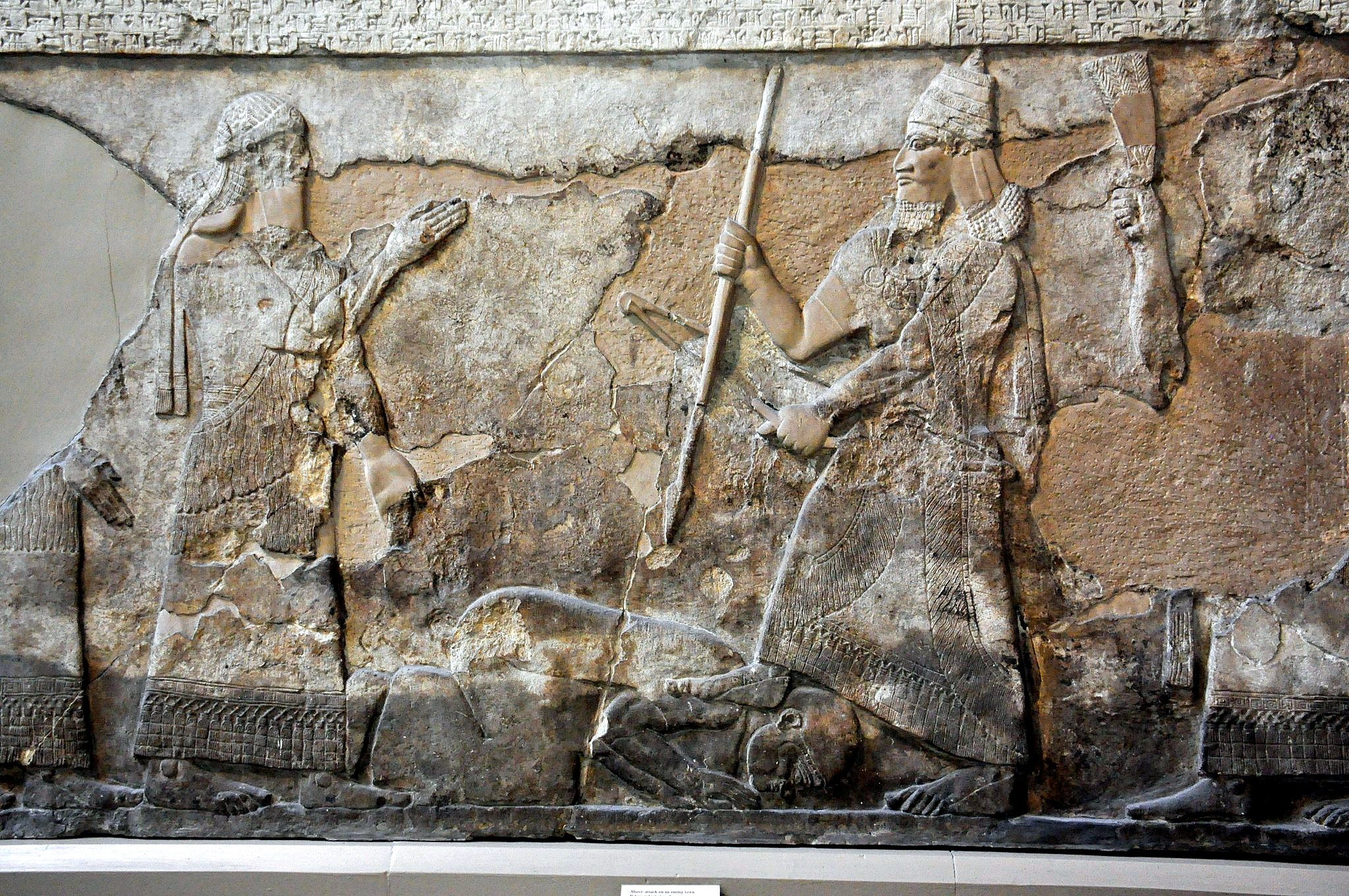
A relief from Nimrud depicting Tiglath-Pileser (right) trampling a defeated enemy

One of Tiglath-Pileser's important early reforms was reducing the influence of the magnates, thus increasing the king's authority. The division of the large provinces previously governed by the magnates into smaller units, placed under royally appointed provincial governors, reduced the wealth and power of the magnates. The right to commission inscriptions concerning military and building activities was withdrawn from officials and henceforth restricted to the king. Some historically prominent officials, such as the turtanu Shamshi-ilu, were subjected to damnatio memoriae, with their names being deliberately erased from inscriptions and documents. With these reforms, the power of the magnates to challenge the king was virtually eliminated.

Tiglath-Pileser revitalized the Assyrian army, transforming it from a seasonally active army, only assembled in the summer months, consisting only of conscripts, into a professional army. Under Tiglath-Pileser, these conscripts were largely replaced with trained, specialized soldiers. He introduced new and superior weapons, technologies and logistics. Among his major innovations were new forms of siege engines. The central standing army introduced under Tiglath-Pileser was dubbed the kiṣir šarri ("king's unit").

The size of the army was further increased throughout Tiglath-Pileser's reign through the recruitment of soldiers from the various lands the Assyrians conquered and through the recruitment of mercenaries from Babylonia, the Zagros Mountains and Anatolia. Though Tiglath-Pileser's conquests generated massive revenue, he appears to have invested little of it into the Assyrian heartland itself; the only known building work he conducted was a new palace in Nimrud. Instead, most of the money probably went into establishing the new army and into projects in the provinces.

Tiglath-Pileser's conquests were marked by brutality to emphasize the king's strength and power. Resettlements of tens, if not hundreds, of thousands of people were also a common practice. Though previous kings had resettled people, Tiglath-Pileser's reign saw the beginning of frequent mass deportations, a policy which continued under his successors. There were two intended goals of this policy: firstly to reduce the local identities in conquered regions, to counteract the risk of revolt, and secondly to recruit and move laborers to where the Assyrian kings needed them, such as underdeveloped and underutilized provinces. Though the Assyrian resettlements were probably devastating both for the resettled people and the regions they came from, resettled people were not harmed or killed. Deportees were highly valued for their labor and abilities. Their journeys and new settlements were designed to be as safe and comfortable as possible.

=== Wars and conquests ===
==== Early campaigns ====
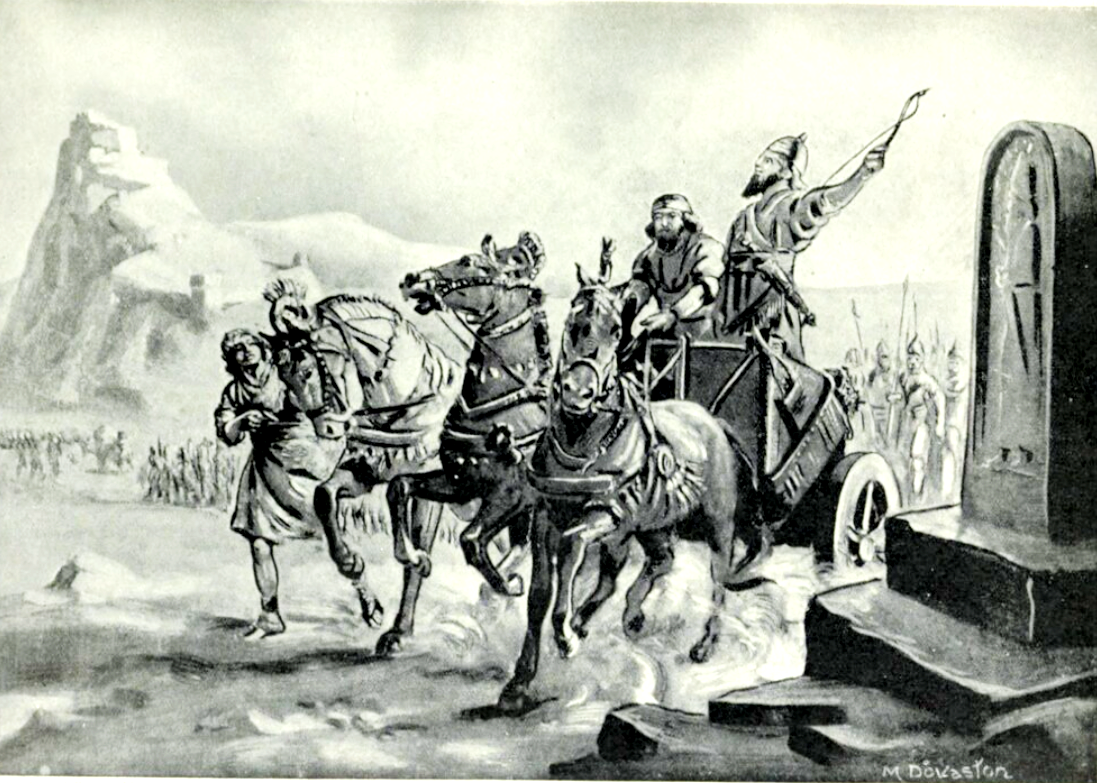
20th-century illustration of Tiglath-Pileser in 743 BC outside Tushpa, the capital of Urartu

In addition to his reforms, Tiglath-Pileser's reign is marked by a series of large-scale military campaigns in all directions. Though Tiglath-Pileser recorded his military exploits in great detail in his "annals", written on sculpted stone slabs decorating his palace in Nimrud, these are poorly preserved, meaning that for several of his campaigns it is only possible to produce a broad outline. Tiglath-Pileser's first campaign was conducted already in 744, when he assaulted Babylonian lands on the east side of the Tigris river. This conflict was resolved swiftly, with the Assyro-Babylonian border shifted in Tiglath-Pileser's favor. In 743, Tiglath-Pileser campaigned in the region around the Zagros Mountains, where he created the two new provinces Bit‐Ḫamban and Parsua. The new Zagros provinces were founded along a highly important trade route, the predecessor of the later Silk Road.

The Assyrian successes in 744 and 743 demonstrated to the empire's neighbors that the time of Assyrian stagnation was over. Tiglath-Pileser's success inspired Iranzu, king of the Mannaeans, a people who lived in northwestern Iran, to personally meet with Tiglath-Pileser in 744 and forge an alliance. Iranzu's predecessors had usually maintained their kingdom's independence through changing allegiance between Urartu and Assyria, but Iranzu made a firm choice to side with Assyria and Tiglath-Pileser eagerly accepted the alliance since Iranzu's realm was ideally placed to protect Assyria from Urartian raids.

These developments worried Sarduri II of Urartu, who intensified his efforts to oppose and overtake Assyrian hegemony. Later in 743, Sarduri arrived at the Euphrates river border of Assyria with his army, his forces bolstered by troops sent by various kingdoms and states in Syria. In the same year, Tiglath-Pileser engaged Sarduri in battle near Arpad. Unlike the Assyrian defeat by Arpad eleven years earlier, Tiglath-Pileser won the battle, one of the greatest triumphs of his reign. Sarduri was forced to flee the battle and was pursued back to the Urartian capital of Tushpa.

==== Conquest of the Levant ====
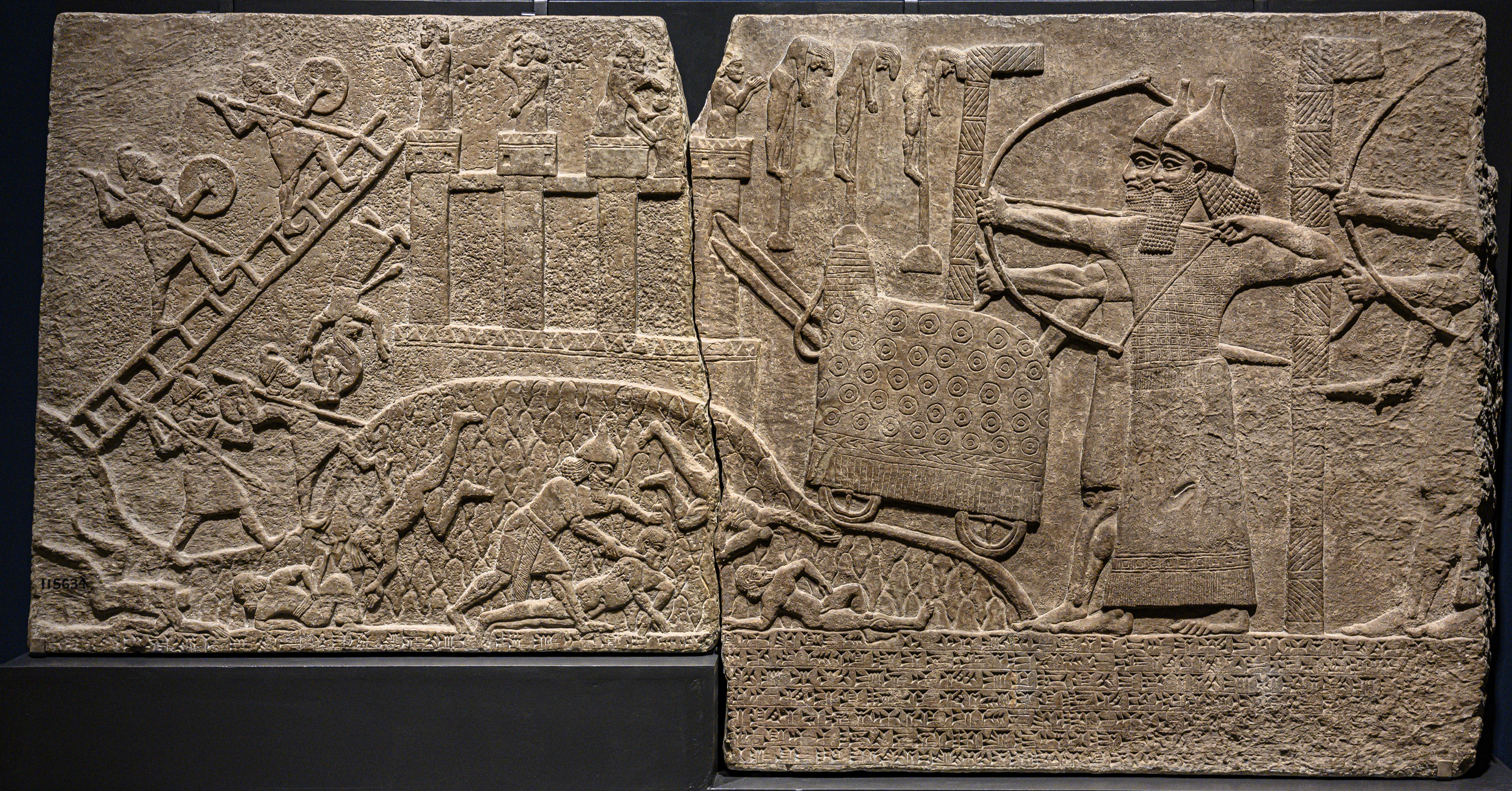
A relief from Tiglath-Pileser's palace in Nimrud, depicting the Assyrians besieging a town

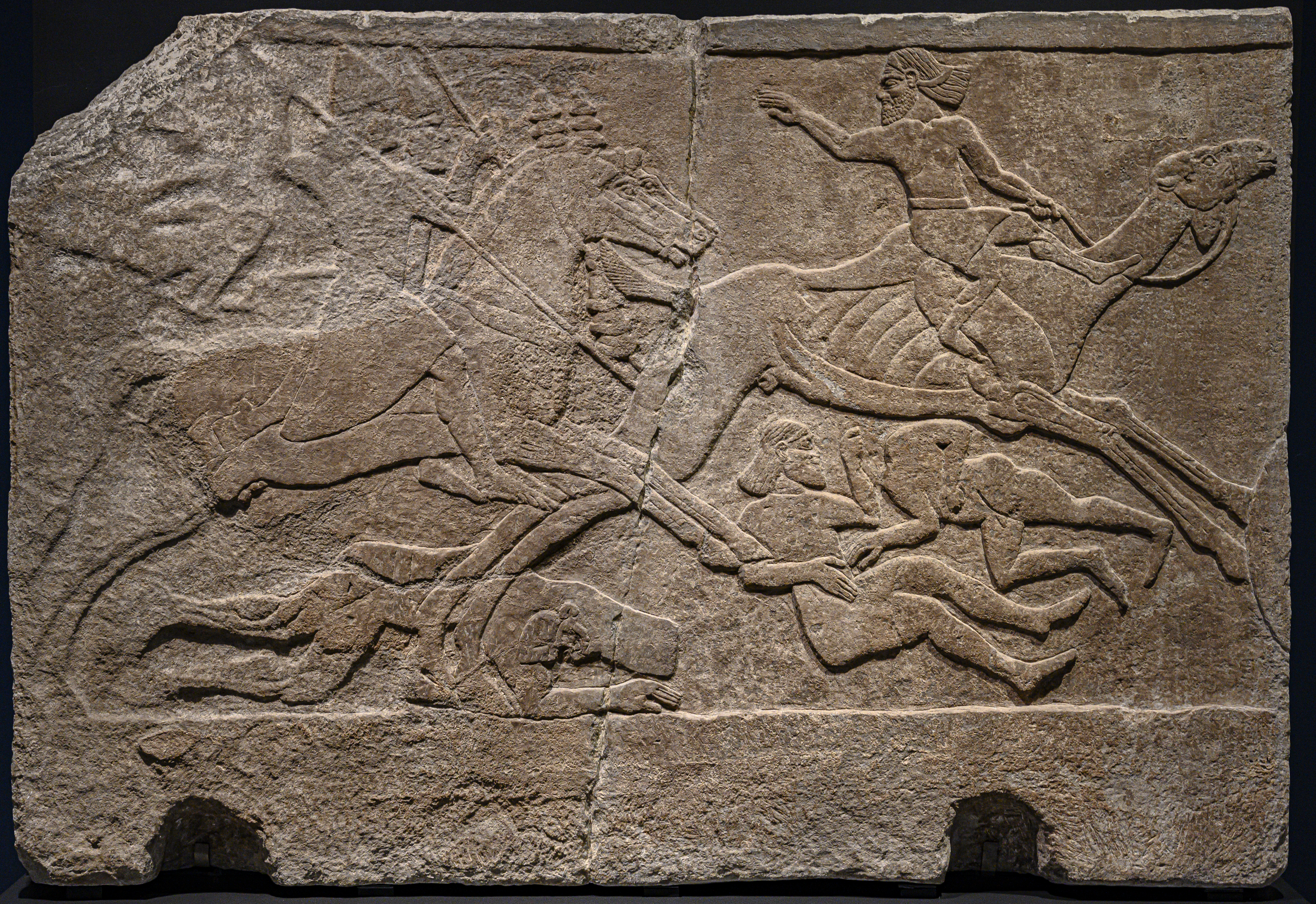
Relief from Tiglath-Pileser's palace in Nimrud depicting Assyrian riders pursuing a camel rider

In the period from 743 to 732, Tiglath-Pileser led several campaigns in the Levant, which led to a great annexation of territory and the loss of independence of numerous ancient states in the region. After defeating Sarduri, Tiglath-Pileser resolved to conquer Arpad itself, both because of the city's strategic value and in order to punish the city for providing Sarduri access to the Assyrian frontier. After three campaigns over the course of three years and a lengthy siege, Arpad was captured in 740.

During the fighting, Arpad was assisted by both Urartian troops and by troops sent by other cities and minor states in Syria. After the city was captured, the Assyrian army did not simply plunder it and then leave, as they had dealt with cities in Syria in previous times. Instead, the lands controlled by Arpad were converted into two provinces and annexed into the Neo-Assyrian Empire. After his victory at Arpad, Tiglath-Pileser received tribute from the Neo-Hittite kingdoms of Gurgum and Kummuh, Carchemish and Quwê, some of which had previously sent forces to aid Sarduri, as well as from the Phoenician city of Tyre and the Aramean kingdom of Aram-Damascus.

The annexation of Arpad put rulers throughout the Levant on the alert. In the period of Assyrian stagnation, many of the Levantine states had aspired to expand and become large kingdoms in their own right, something the Assyrians might have perceived as an anti-Assyrian activity. In 738, Tiglath-Pileser continued his efforts in Syria, conquering some lands to the south of Arpad and establishing the three new provinces of Kullania, Ḫatarikka, and Ṣimirra. These lands had been under the rule of the Neo-Hittite kingdom of Hama, which he accused of plotting against him.

The strategy employed by Tiglath-Pileser in his successful conquest of the Levant was carefully thought out and prepared. Instead of attacking the strongholds of the larger states, he first subdued smaller kingdoms through fast and wide-ranging attacks. The early conquests brought coastal and flat lands under his rule, which meant that Assyrian troops in the later campaigns could march through the region fast and efficiently. During the campaign against Hama, Tiglath-Pileser conquered and annexed the Neo-Hittite kingdom of Pattin. Hama was spared full annexation, with the kingdom being allowed to remain somewhat independent as a vassal state. The victory inspired more states in the region to pay tribute to the Assyrians, including the Phoenician city of Byblos, the Kingdom of Israel and various states in eastern Anatolia and some Arab tribes. Israel and Damascus had sent aid to Hama during the conflict.

The Anatolian realms who began paying tribute to Assyria, five kingdoms in total, probably did so not out of fear of Assyrian conquest but rather in the hope of Assyrian aid against the expansionist kingdom of Phrygia, which threatened their existence. The Anatolians at times tried to play Assyria and Phrygia against each other, with disastrous consequences. In 730, Tiglath-Pileser attacked and removed king Wasusarma of Tabal from power after he stopped paying tribute, writing in his annals that Wasusarma "acted as if he were the equal of Assyria".

Tiglath-Pileser marched on the Levant for the fifth time in 734, reaching as far south as the border of Egypt. This campaign resulted in the conquest of Gaza and the submission of numerous states, effectively bringing the entire Levant under direct or indirect Assyrian rule; Assyria and Egypt shared a border for the first time in history. Asqaluna, Judah, Edom, Moab and Ammon, and the Mu’na Arab tribe, all began paying tribute to Tiglath-Pileser. By extending his control throughout the Levant, Tiglath-Pileser formed a semi-circle of control around Israel and Aram-Damascus and cut them off from Egypt, which had at times offered support to the Levantine states. The Assyrian efforts resulted in Aram-Damascus becoming both geopolitically isolated and without a large enough food supply to feed its people.

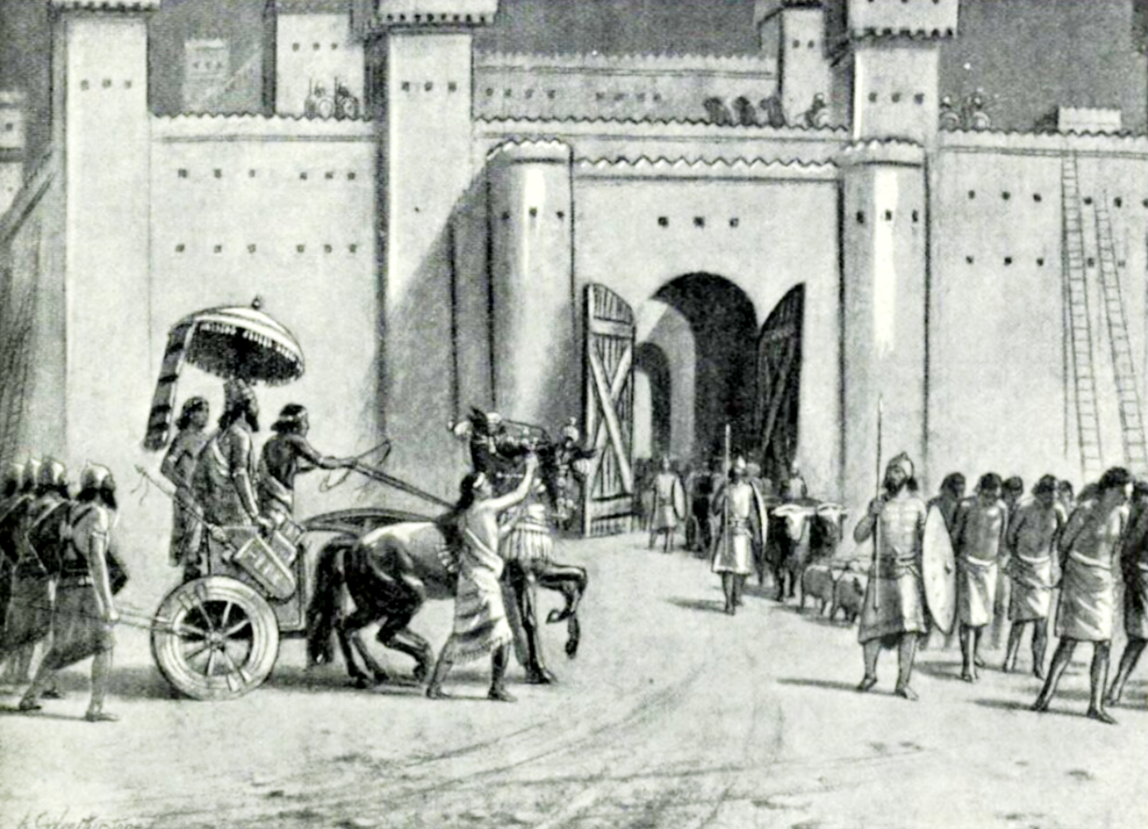
A 20th-century illustration of Tiglath-Pileser's 732 BC capture of Damascus

In 733, Tiglath-Pileser resolved to cement his conquest. In this year, he again campaigned against Aram-Damascus, still the strongest remaining native state in the region, which was supported by the Assyrian tributaries Tyre and Asqaluna, as well as Israel. In 732, Damascus fell and Tiglath-Pileser annexed the lands of Aram-Damascus. In the same conflict, Tiglath-Pileser also captured Tyre and defeated Israel, which he divided in half, annexing the northern portion of the kingdom as the province Megiddo and subjugating the southern portion as a vassal kingdom. The weakening and enormous reduction in size of Israel was seen by the Israelites as vindicating predictions of impending doom made by the prophet Amos a few decades prior.

The massive western expansion of Assyria brought Tiglath-Pileser and his armies into direct contact with Arab tribes, several of whom began paying tribute. In 733, Tiglath-Pileser campaigned against the Qedarites to the south of Damascus, hoping to consolidate his control of southern Syria. The surprise attack caught the Qedarite queen Šamši off-guard and the Qedarites were easily defeated. Though Tiglath-Pileser was victorious, he realized that he would not be able to govern the territories ruled by the Qedarites effectively and thus allowed Šamši to remain in control of her domain, though under the supervision of an Assyrian official to guide her political actions.

==== Conquest of Babylonia ====
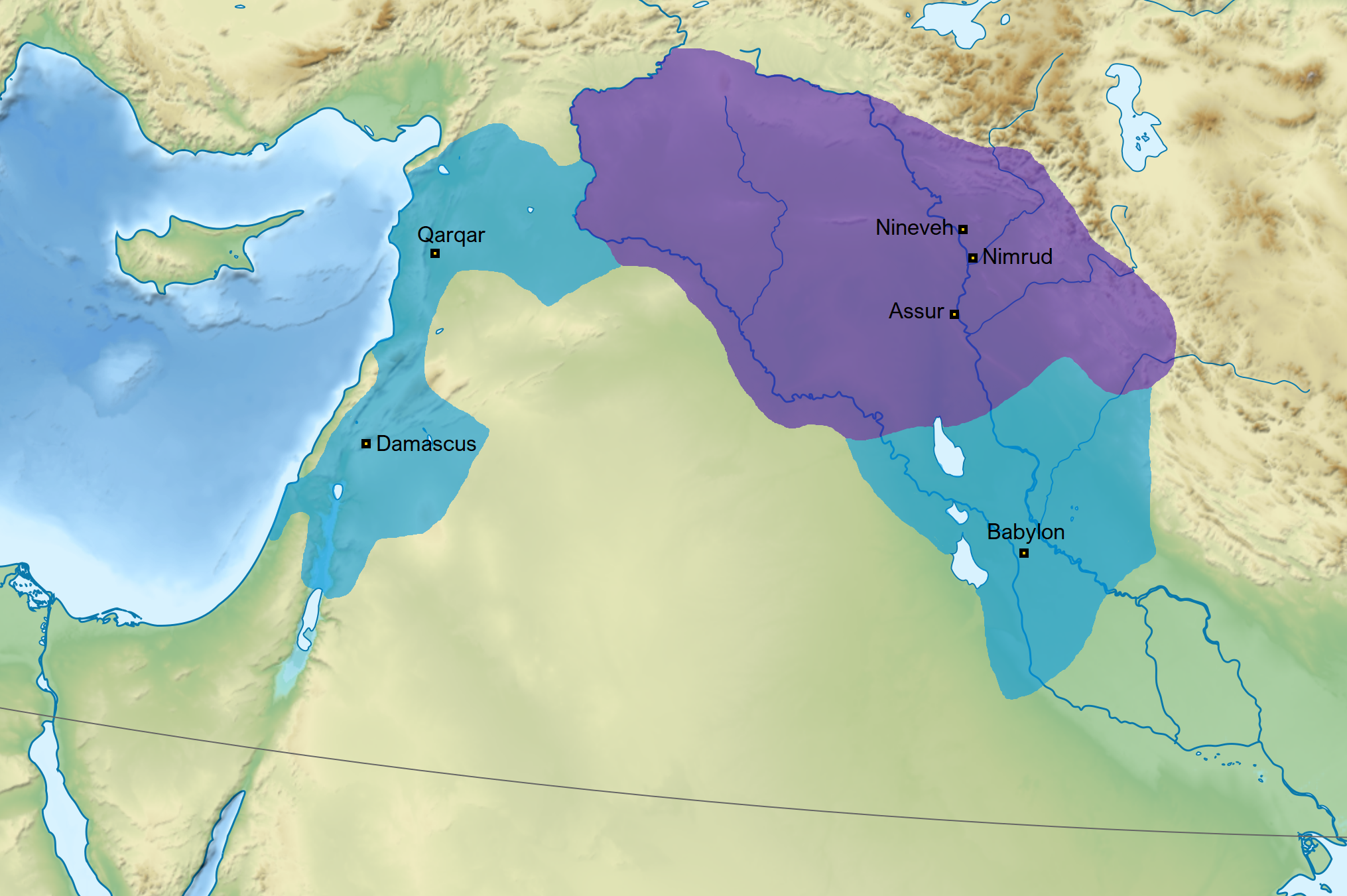
A map of the Neo-Assyrian Empire before (purple) and after (purple and blue) Tiglath-Pileser's reign

In his late reign, Tiglath-Pileser increasingly focused on Babylonia in the south. Babylonia had once been a large and hugely influential kingdom, competing with Assyria for centuries, but during the Neo-Assyrian period it was typically weaker than its northern neighbor. Babylonia suffered from both the lack of a well-organized army and from internal ethno-cultural divisions. Babylonians governed most of the prominent southern cities, such as Babylon, Kish, Ur, Uruk, Borsippa and Nippur, but were not the only prominent group in the region. Chaldean tribes, led by chieftains who often squabbled with each other, dominated most of the southernmost land. Arameans also lived on the fringes of settled land and were notorious for plundering surrounding territories. Through his agents, Tiglath-Pileser throughout his reign kept tabs on events in the south.

In 731, the Chaldean chieftain Nabu-mukin-zeri, of the Bit-Amukkani tribe, seized power in Babylon as king. Tiglath-Pileser saw the accession of Nabu-mukin-zeri, who aspired to heal the divides in Babylonia, as a provocation and threat to Assyrian interests and hegemony. Tiglath-Pileser thus dedicated the next several years to defeating Nabu-mukin-zeri and his supporters. First, Assyrian armies blockaded Babylonia's eastern border to ensure that Nabu-mukin-zeri would not receive any support from Elam, which was often opposed to Assyrian interests. Then, Tiglath-Pileser defeated and subdued a number of Aramean clans and Chaldean tribes, including the Bit-Shilani and the Bit-Sha'alli.

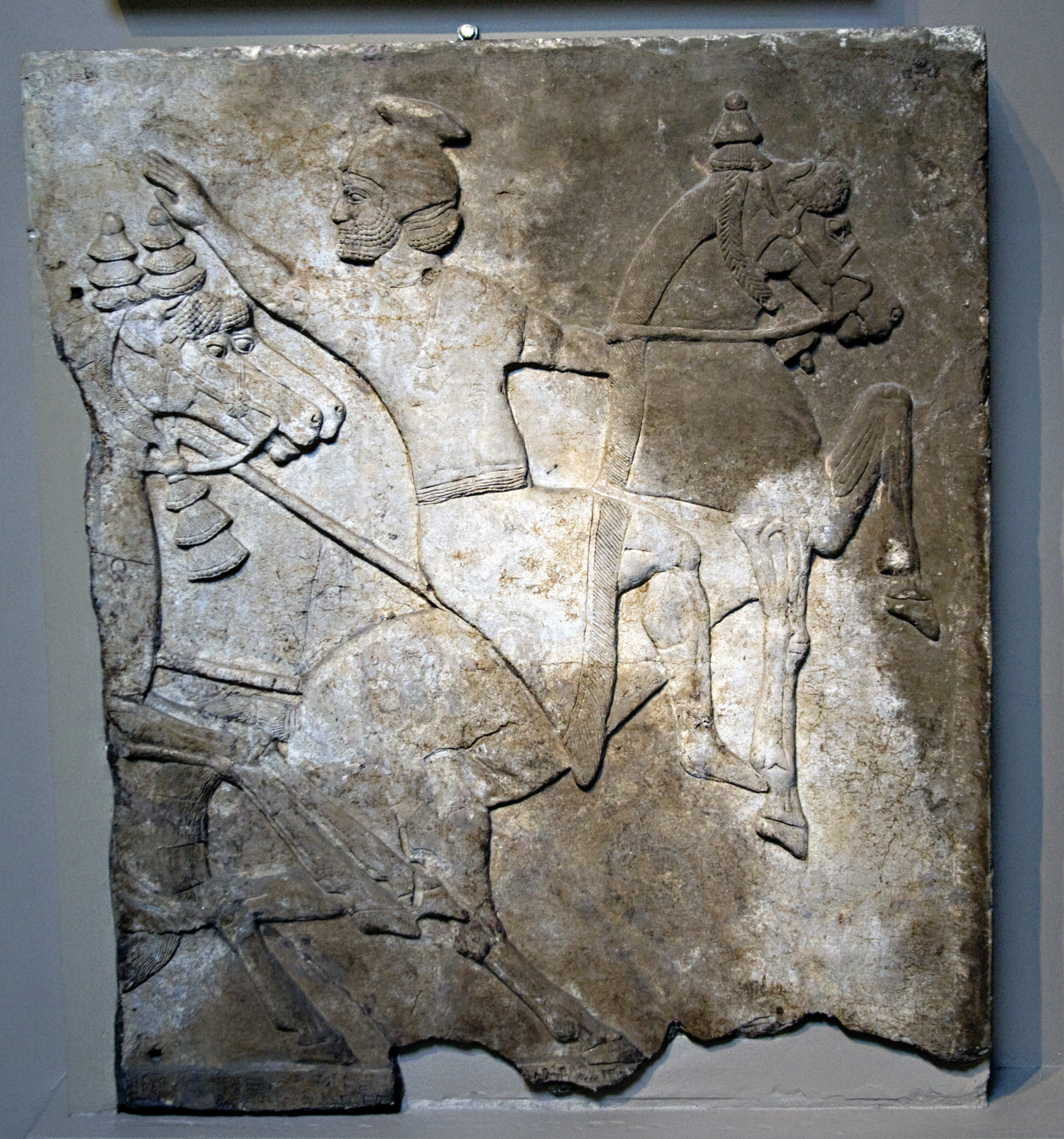
Relief from Tiglath-Pileser's palace in Nimrud depicting an Assyrian horseman

The struggle for control of Babylonia began in earnest in 730. In this year, Assyrian envoys are recorded travelling to Babylon and urging the inhabitants to open their gates and surrender to Tiglath-Pileser, stating that the king would grant them amnesty and tax privileges. The Babylonians refused the offer. Nabu-mukin-zeri was not in Babylon at this time and was instead probably directing the Babylonian war effort from his ancestral home city of Sapia. In 729, Tiglath-Pileser captured Babylon and proclaimed himself as both king of Assyria and king of Babylon, the first Assyrian king to be recognized as such by the Babylonians.

Nabu-mukin-zeri lost Sapia in the same year but appears to have continued to resist Tiglath-Pileser until 728 since there are some documents ascribed to his fourth regnal year. As the new king, Tiglath-Pileser received tribute from the most powerful Chaldean tribes, the Bit-Dakkuri and Bit-Yakin. The Bit-Yakin at this time was under the leadership of Marduk-apla-iddina II, who in the years following Tiglath-Pileser's reign would emerge as a staunch adversary of Assyria.

Unlike many other Assyrian conquests, Babylonia was not divided into provinces but kept as a full kingdom, in personal union with Assyria. This was chiefly because the Assyrians greatly respected Babylonian culture and religion. Because of this respect and because Babylonia was showing signs of the beginning of an economic recovery, Tiglath-Pileser worked to conciliate the populace to the idea of Assyrian overlordship. He twice participated in the religiously important New Years' Akitu festival, which required the presence of the king, and also led campaigns against remaining Chaldean strongholds in the far south who resisted his rule.

== Family and succession ==
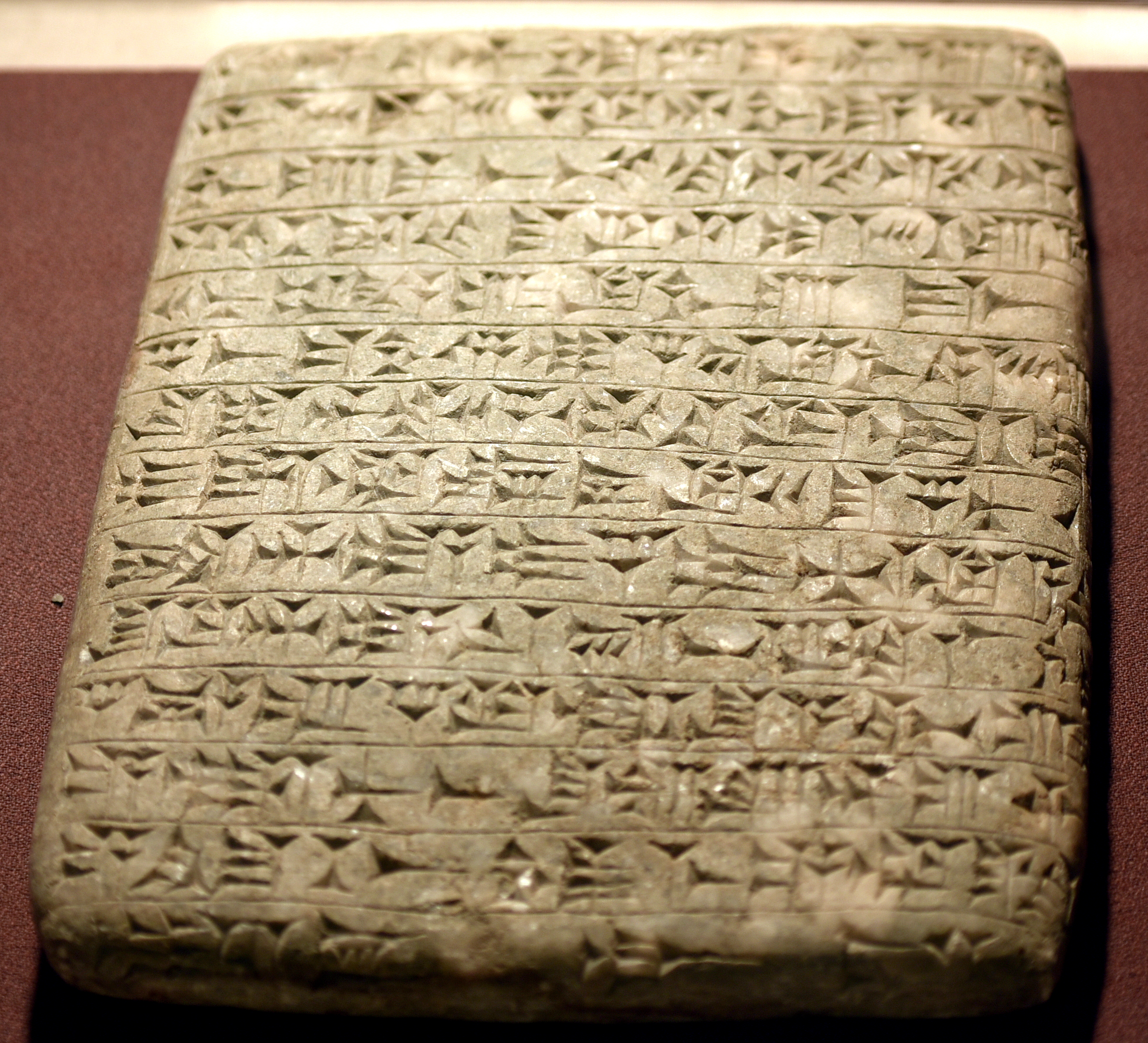
A funerary stone tablet of Iaba, Tiglath-Pileser's queen, from Nimrud

Tiglath-Pileser's queen was named Iaba (Iabâ), a name clearly not of Akkadian origin. Possible roots and etymologies of the name include yph ("beautiful"), nby ("to name") and yhb ("to give"); Iaba might have been of Arab or West Semitic (Levantine or Aramean) descent. In 1998, Stephanie Dalley proposed that Iaba was of Hebrew origin and speculated that she might have been a princess from the Kingdom of Judah. She based this argument on the name Atalia, a later queen speculated to have been related to Iaba, being similar to the name Athaliah, borne by a Judean queen who ruled about a century earlier, and that the ending of the name Atalia (i-a or ia-a) could represent a theophoric element deriving from Yahweh. Dalley's arguments have met with both support and opposition. The idea that the names Iaba and Atalia were Hebrew has also been independently forwarded by Simo Parpola.

In 2002, K. Lawson Younger pointed out that it was far from certain that i-a or ia-a actually corresponded to Yahweh since there are few analogues in other Neo-Assyrian names and inscriptions. The identification of Atalia as a Hebrew name was also doubted by Nicholas Postgate in 2008, and in that year Ran Zadok alternatively suggested that Atalia was an Arabic name. Iaba's tomb was discovered at Nimrud in 1989.

Tiglath-Pileser is believed to have died peacefully of old age. He was succeeded by his son Shalmaneser V. In Tiglath-Pileser's reign, Shalmaneser was known by his birth name Ululayu, "Shalmaneser" being a regnal name he assumed upon his accession to the throne in 727. Shalmaneser likely participated in some of his father's campaigns and several letters are known from him to his father, many of them reports on the status of the lands he governed. Shalmaneser was replaced as king after only a few years by Sargon II, probably through being deposed and assassinated. Though Assyrian king lists connected Sargon to previous kings through claiming that he was the son of Tiglath-Pileser, this claim does not appear in most of his inscriptions, which instead stress that he was called upon and appointed as king by Ashur.

Many historians accept Ashur’s claim to have been a son of Tiglath-Pileser, but do not believe him to have been the legitimate heir to the throne as the second-in-line after the end of Iaba’s reign, i.e. assuming Shalmaneser had children. Even then, his claim to have been Tiglath-Pileser's son is generally treated with more caution than Tiglath-Pileser's own claims of royal ancestry. Some Assyriologists, such as J. A. Brinkman, believe that Sargon, at the very least, did not belong to the direct dynastic lineage. If Tiglath-Pileser was Sargon's father, he also had a third son, Sin-ahu-usur. Sin-ahu-usur is attested as the younger brother of Sargon, in 714 granted the command of Sargon's royal cavalry guard.

== Legacy ==
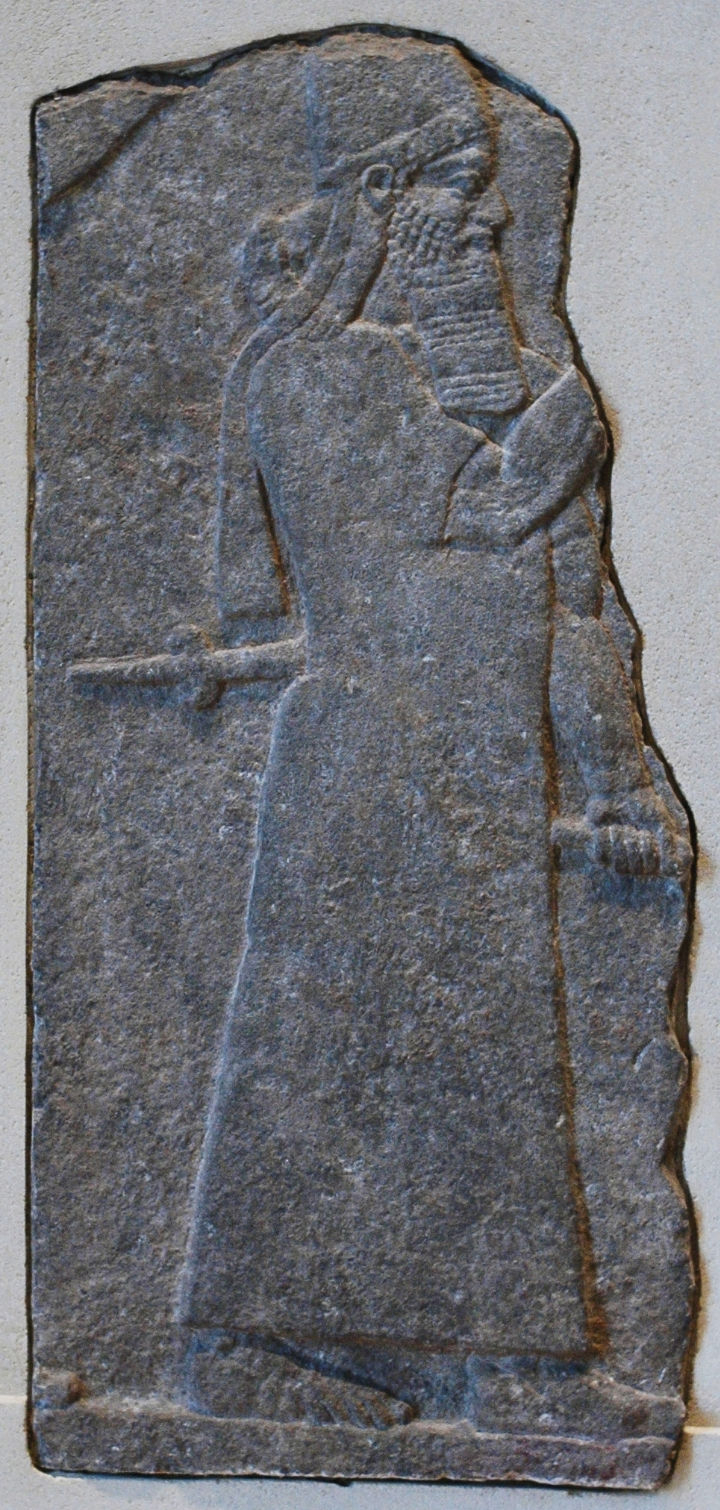
A relief from Nimrud depicting Tiglath-Pileser

The Assyriologist Hayim Tadmor referred to Tiglath-Pileser's reign as a "watershed" in the history of the Middle East. Tiglath-Pileser left a legacy of enormous historical significance. His reign is generally seen as marking the beginning of an entirely new age of Assyrian imperialism. As the earliest Assyrian king to be mentioned in the Hebrew Bible and in the Babylonian Chronicles, Tiglath-Pileser is the first Assyrian king for whom there exist outside perspectives and accounts of his reign. All Mesopotamian history prior to Tiglath-Pileser is ignored in the Hebrew Bible. The Bible records both Tiglath-Pileser's impact on the Kingdom of Israel (2 Kings 15:29–31) and the events of his reign from the perspective of the southern Kingdom of Judah (2 Kings 15:32–16, 20, 2 Chronicles 27:1–28, Isaiah 7:1–25).

Tiglath-Pileser greatly expanded Assyrian territory. By the time of his death, Tiglath-Pileser had more than doubled the amount of land ruled by the Neo-Assyrian Empire. His method of introducing direct Assyrian rule to foreign lands, dividing them into Assyrian provinces rather than creating vassal kingdoms, significantly altered the economy of the Assyrian state. Whereas the Assyrians had previously relied on tribute from vassals, from Tiglath-Pileser's time they became increasingly dependent on taxes collected by provincial governors. This approach increased administrative costs but also reduced the risk of uprisings against Assyrian rule and reduced the need for military intervention.

Several Assyriologists consider Assyria to only truly have transitioned into an "empire" in a strict sense during the reign of Tiglath-Pileser, owing to its unprecedented size, multi-ethnic and multi-lingual character and the new mechanisms of economic and political control. The supremacy attained by Assyria under Tiglath-Pileser is frequently seen as turning the Neo-Assyrian Empire into the first world empire in history; i.e. an imperial state without any competitors, ruling most of the world as known to the Assyrians themselves.

The Assyrian Empire served as the model for later empires in the Middle East and elsewhere, chiefly because of the imperial innovations of Tiglath-Pileser. Through the concept of translatio imperii (transfer of empire) the claim to world domination forwarded by the Neo-Assyrian kings gave rise to similar claims in later Middle Eastern empires, notably the Achaemenid Empire, which facilitated the rise of aspirations for universal rule in numerous later kingdoms and empires.

The Assyrian resettlement policy which intensified under Tiglath-Pileser and continued under his successors had large-scale consequences. First and foremost, it led to significant improvements in irrigation in the provinces, owing to deportees being tasked to introduce Assyrian-developed agricultural techniques to their new communities, and to an increase in prosperity across the empire. In the long term, the movement of peoples from across the empire changed the cultural and ethnic makeup of the Middle East forever and in time led to the rise of Aramaic as the region's lingua franca, a position the language retained until the 14th century AD.

Aramaic was the most widely spoken and mutually understandable of the empire's Semitic languages, the group to which many of the languages in the empire belonged. Already in Tiglath-Pileser's reign, Aramaic became an official language in the empire, indicated by reliefs from his time depicting the king using both Aramaic and Akkadian scribes to record messages.

== Titles ==
In an inscription from Nimrud recounting some of the activities of his reign, Tiglath-Pileser claimed the following titles:

Tiglath-Pileser, the great king, the mighty king, king of the universe, king of Assyria, king of Sumer and Akkad, king of the four corners of the world; who is attentive to the lifting of the eyes of Enlil, the king who from the rising sun to the setting thereof has scattered all of his foes to the wind(s) and has maintained (his) sway; who subdues the peoples of the upper and lower land(s), who ousts their rulers and installs his (own) officials.

== See also ==
- List of Assyrian kings
- Military history of the Neo-Assyrian Empire
- Iran Stele

== Notes ==
Tiglath-Pileser III Adaside dynasty Born: c. 795 BC Died: 727 BC
Preceded by Ashur-nirari V	King of Assyria; 745 – 727 BC	Succeeded by Shalmaneser V
Preceded by Nabu-mukin-zeri	King of Babylon; 729 – 727 BC	Succeeded by Shalmaneser V
