= Shamshi-ilu =

Assyrian courtier and general (fl. 8th century BCE)

Shamshi-ilu (Šamši-ilu) was an influential court dignitary and commander in chief (turtanu) of the Assyrian army who rose in high prominence.

He was active during the reigns of Assyrian kings Adad-nirari III (810–782 BC), Shalmaneser IV (782–772 BC), Ashur-dan III (771–754 BC) and Ashur-nirari V (754–746 BC). Three times, in 780, 770 and 752 BC, he held the office of limmu officials. He resided at Til Barsip, which is now in northern Syria, and where there are many inscriptions mentioning him.

== Origins ==
Shamshi-ilu probably was not born in Assyria, though he was from noble lineage of the Adini tribe and was more than likely educated at the Assyrian court. Later, he rose in the ranks of the Assyrian army to become the commander in chief (turtanu) who had a high degree of influence over the kings of Assyria who lived in his time. He was probably made governor when Shalmaneser III annexed the territories of the Bit-Adini.

Some scholars suggested that he might have been of royal Assyrian birth. Wolfram von Soden believed that he might have been a younger son of Adad-narari III. A gold bowl with an inscription of Samsi-ilu had been discovered in the grave of queen Mullissu-mukannishat-Ninua, so this may indicate that he had some connection with the royal family.

== Turtanu ==
Rising in high order through the ranks thanks to his teachings in the Assyrian ways Shamshi-ilu rose to the highest position in the army under the Kings Adad-Nirari III and Shalmaneser IV.

According to the Antakya stele inscription of Adad-nirari III dating around 800 BC, Shamshi-ilu mediated in the border dispute between the kingdoms of Hamath and Arpad. At that time, around 796 BC, due to the weakness of the royal power, and the young age of the king, Shamshi-ilu probably became a gray eminence at the Assyrian court, managing the affairs of the state.

He also could have been around much later, possibly coming into contact with Pulu (Tiglath-Pileser III) at some point. He may possibly have taken part in the rebellion that saw Tiglath-pileser III take the throne from Ashur-nirari V, although he may have been dead at this point.

According to Grayson,

"In his own inscriptions he [Shamshi-ilu] has a grandiose list of titles: "field marshal, great herald, administrator of temples, chief of the extensive army, governor of the lands Hatti, Guti, and Namri (Hurrian region around Tigris river)". That is, he claims to have governed the lands stretching all the way from central Anatolia, through Armenia, Kurdistan, as far as the East Tigris region around the Diyala River."

== Campaigns ==
Shamshi-ilu's most famous and well documented campaign was against the Urartu king Argishti I in 780 BCE. His name appeared on many public monuments such as the colossal stone lion which accounts for his victories on this campaign. He is also known to have transferred land and border agreements with the Syro-Hittites, which are recorded on a stone stele. He quite possibly could have been the prime leader in the Damascus campaign in 796 BCE.

The information about Shamshi-ilu ends at the end of the reign of Ashur-nirari V, when Assyria was swept by a wave of revolts and riots, which in 745 BC succeeded Tiglath-pileser III (745–727 BC).

== See also ==
- Zakkur

== Bibliography ==
- Leick, Gwendolyn (2002). "Shamshi-ilu". Who's Who in the Ancient Near East. Routledge. ISBN 9781134787951.
- Grayson, Albert Kirk [in German] (1996). Assyrian Rulers of the Early First Millennium BC.: (858-745 BC). II. University of Toronto Press. pp. 231–236. ISBN 9780802008862.
- Hawkins, J.D. (1982). "9 THE NEO-HITTITE STATES IN SYRIA AND ANATOLIA". The Cambridge Ancient History The Prehistory of the Balkans, the Middle East and the Aegean World, Tenth to Eighth Centuries BC. Vol. 3. Cambridge University Press. pp. 404–405. ISBN 9780521224963.
