= Gurgum =

Neo-Hittite state

Gurgum Kurkuma
- Unknown–711 BC
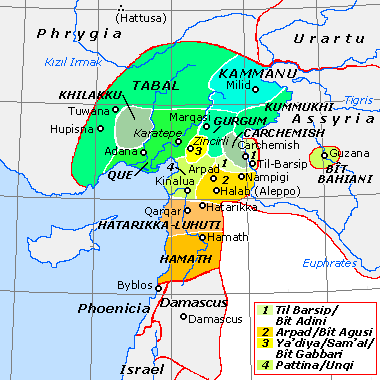
- Gurgum and its capital Marqas(i) among the Neo-Hittite states
- Capital: Marqas (modern-day Kahramanmaraş, Turkey)
- Common languages: Hieroglyphic Luwian
- Religion: Luwian religion
- Government: Monarchy
- Historical era: Iron Age
  - Established: Unknown
  - Disestablished: 711 BC
Preceded by	Succeeded by
Hittite empire	Neo-Assyrian Empire
- Today part of: Turkey

Gurgum was a Neo-Hittite state in Anatolia, known from the 10th to the 7th century BC. Its name is given as Gurgum in Assyrian sources, while its native name seems to have been Kurkuma for the reason that the capital of Gurgum—Marqas in Assyrian sources (today Maraş)—was named "the Kurkumaean city" (ku+ra/i-ku-ma-wa/i-ni-i-sà(URBS)) in local Hieroglyphic Luwian inscriptions.

== History ==
The first historical event in the history of Gurgum is known for the reign of Larama I c. 950 BC. This Gurgumaean king undertook a program of reconstruction including the replanting of crops and vineyards.

In 858 BC, during the first western campaign of the Assyrian king Shalmaneser III, king Muwatalli II of Gurgum submitted to the Assyrians and paid them tribute. This tribute consisted of gold, silver, oxen, sheep, wine, and his own daughter with her dowry.

Muwatalli II's son, King Halparuntiya II, undertook several military expeditions. He attacked the city (or land?) of Hirika (probably to be identified with the land of Hilakku or a Melidian border city named Hiliki) and captured the city Iluwasi. In 853 BC he paid tribute to the Assyrians as his father did before him.

In 805 BC, Halparuntiya III invaded the neighbouring kingdom of Kummuh for territorial reasons. The king of Kummuh, Suppiluliuma (Assyrian Ušpilulume), appealed to the Assyrian king Adad-nirari III for help, and the Assyrians fixed the border between Gurgum and Kummuh.

Around 800 BC, Gurgum was part of a coalition of numerous Neo-Hittite and Aramean states hostile to the Hamathite king Zakkur.

In the reign of Tarhulara in 743 BC, Gurgum also took part in an anti-Assyrian military alliance led by Sarduri II of Urartu and Mati-Ilu of Arpad. The Assyrian king Tiglath-pileser III defeated the hostile alliance and also invaded Gurgum, destroying 100 Gurgumaean cities. Tarhulara submitted and beseeched the Assyrian king to spare the capital Marqas. Tarhulara was allowed to stay on the throne and henceforth was an Assyrian tributary, paying tribute to the Assyrian king in 738 and 732 BC.

In 711 BC, Tarhulara was assassinated by his son Muwatalli III, who then seized the throne of Gurgum. The Assyrian king Sargon II responded by deposing Muwatalli III and deporting him to Assyria. Gurgum was annexed to the Assyrian empire and renamed Marqas after the name of the capital city.

== Rulers ==
Name	Reign	Dynastic Placement	Assyrian Name	Sources
Astuwaramanza	late 11th century BC			Luwian
Muwatalli I	early 10th century BC	son of Astuwaramanza		Luwian
Larama I	ca. 950 BC	son of Muwatalli I		Luwian
Muwizi	later 10th century BC	son of Larama I		Luwian
Halparuntiya I	earlier 9th century BC	son of Muwizi		Luwian
Muwatalli II	858 BC	son of Halparuntiya I	Mutallu	Luwian, Assyrian
Halparuntiya II	ca. 853 BC	son of Muwatalli II	Qalparunda	Luwian, Assyrian
Larama II	later 9th century BC	son of Halparuntiya II	Palalam	Luwian, Assyrian
Halparuntiya III	805 - ca. 800 BC	son of Larama II	Qalparunda	Luwian, Assyrian
Tarhulara	743 - ca. 711 BC		Tarhulara	Assyrian
Muwatalli III	ca. 711 BC	son of Tarhulara	Mutallu	Assyrian

== Literature ==
- Bryce, Trevor (2012). The World of the Neo-Hittite Kingdoms; A Political and Military History. Oxford/New York: Oxford University Press. ISBN 978-0-19-921872-1.
- Payne, Annick; Melchert, H. Craig (2012). Iron Age Hieroglyphic Luwian Inscriptions. Atlanta: Society of Biblical Literature. ISBN 978-1-58983-269-5.

== See also ==
- Ancient regions of Anatolia
