= Battle of Dur-Papsukkal =

Battle in 814 BCE

Date	814 BC
Location	Dur-Papsukkal
Result	Assyrian victory

Belligerents
Neo-Assyrian Empire	Kingdom of Babylonia, Elam; Aramean tribes

Commanders and leaders
Shamshi-Adad V	Marduk-balassu-iqbi

Casualties and losses
Unknown	13,000 soldiers

The Battle of Dur-Papsukkal in 814 BC was fought by the Assyrian king Shamshi-Adad V against the Babylonian king Marduk-balassu-iqbi, some Elamite allies, and few Aramean tribes settled in Babylonia.

After quelling internal rebellions, King Shamshi-Adad V undertook a series of campaigns against Babylonia. After capturing and spoiling several cities, he marched upon the royal city of Dur-Papsukkal. According to Shamshi-Adad V's own inscriptions, he took the city after his troops slew 13.000 soldiers. Afterwards, he looted its treasures and captured the palace women before razing and burning it.

Babylonian King Marduk-balassu-iqbi did not arrive in time to save the city and, with his allied forces of Chaldeans, Elamites, Kassites and Arameans, faced the Assyrians near the city. Shamshi-Adad V claimed victory. This battle marked the limit of their advance on Babylonian lands for the year. He did not subdue Marduk-balassu-iqbi until the following year.

== Classical sources ==
- Babylonian Chronicles: Synchronic Chronicle (ABC 21/CM 10)
- The Royal Inscriptions of Mesopotamia Assyrian Periods Vol 3 (RIMA)
