= Assyrian eclipse =

763 BC solar eclipse

Solar eclipse of June 15, 763 BC
- Total eclipse
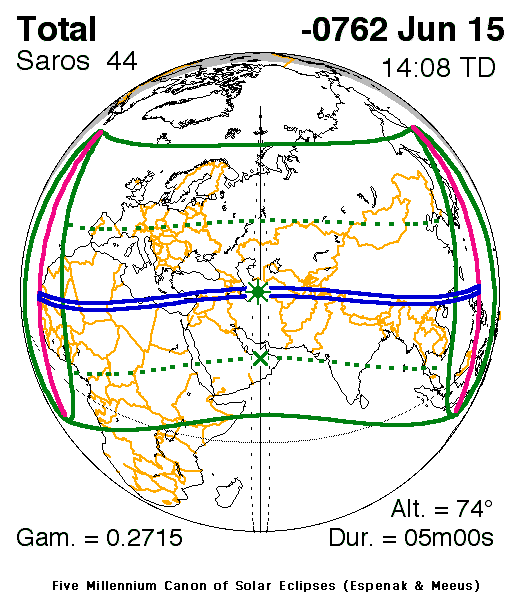
- Solar eclipse of June 15, 763 BC
- Gamma: 0.27139
- Magnitude: 1.05960

Maximum eclipse
- Duration: 120 s (5m 0s)
- Coordinates: 38.9°N 54.3°E
- Max. width of band: 203.8 km

Times (UTC)
- (P1) Partial begin: 05:35:36.2
- (U1) Total begin: 06:31:52.7
- (U2) Central begin: 06:34:18.4
- Greatest eclipse: 08:13:58.4
- (U3) Central end: 09:53:40.5
- (U4) Total end: 09:56:02.4
- (P4) Partial end: 10:52:24.5

References
- Saros: 44 (39 of 72)

A total solar eclipse, commonly referred to as the Assyrian eclipse or the Bur-Sagale eclipse, occurred on 15 June 763 BC in the proleptic Julian calendar, recorded in Assyrian eponym lists that most likely date to the tenth year of the reign of king Ashur-dan III.

A solar eclipse occurs when the Moon passes between the Earth and Sun, completely or partially blocking the Sun for a viewer on Earth. A total solar eclipse occurs when the Moon's apparent diameter is larger than that of the Sun, blocking all of the Sun's light and causing day to turn into darkness. A total eclipse also appears as a partial eclipse, only blocking part of the Sun's light, over a region thousands of kilometers wide.

This eclipse was a member of Saros series 44.

== Observations ==
=== Assyria ===
The entry from Assyrian records is short and reads:

"[year of] Bur-Sagale of Guzana. Revolt in the city of Assur. In the month Simanu an eclipse of the sun took place."

The phrase used – shamash ("the sun") akallu ("bent", "twisted", "crooked", "distorted", "obscured") – has been interpreted as a reference to a solar eclipse since the first decipherment of cuneiform in the mid 19th century. The name Bur-Sagale (also rendered Bur-Saggile, Pur-Sagale or Par-Sagale) is the name of the limmu official in the eponymous year.

=== Bible ===
The Bur-Sagale eclipse occurred over the Assyrian capital city of Nineveh in the middle of the reign of Jeroboam II, who ruled Israel from 786 to 746 B.C. According to 2 Kings 14:25, the prophet Jonah lived and prophesied in Jeroboam's reign. The biblical scholar Donald Wiseman has speculated that the eclipse took place around when Jonah arrived in Nineveh and urged the people to repent, otherwise the city would be destroyed. This would explain the dramatic repentance of the people of Nineveh as described in the Book of Jonah. Ancient cultures, including Assyria, viewed eclipses as omens of imminent destruction, and the empire was in chaos at this time, struggling with revolts, famines and two separate outbreaks of plague.

This eclipse is perhaps also mentioned by the prophet Amos. Amos was also preaching during the reign of Jeroboam II and makes a possible allusion to the eclipse in Amos 5:8 and 8:9. In these passages Amos uses the darkness of an eclipse as a prophecy of doom, and exhorts Judeans to repentance.

== Modern research ==
In 1867, Henry Rawlinson identified the near-total eclipse of 15 June 763 BC as the most likely candidate (the month Simanu corresponding to the May/June lunation), visible in northern Assyria just before noon. This date has been widely accepted ever since; the identification is also substantiated by other astronomical observations from the same period.

This record is one of the crucial pieces of evidence that anchor the absolute chronology of the ancient Near East for the Assyrian period.

== See also ==
- Chronology of the ancient Near East
- Akitu
- Historical astronomy
- Eclipse of Thales
- Mursili's eclipse
