= Ashur-nirari V =

- King of Assyria

King of the Neo-Assyrian Empire
- Reign: 755–745 BC
- Predecessor: Ashur-dan III
- Successor: Tiglath-Pileser III
- Died: 745 BC
- Issue: Tiglath-Pileser III (?)
- Akkadian: Aššur-nārāri
- Dynasty: Adaside dynasty
- Father: Adad-nirari III

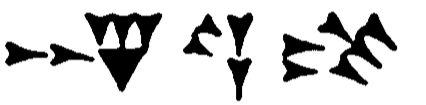
Ashur-nirari V (Neo-Assyrian cuneiform: Aššur-nārāri, meaning "Ashur is my help") was the king of the Neo-Assyrian Empire from 755 BC to his death in 745 BC. Ashur-nirari was a son of Adad-nirari III (r. 811–783 BC) and succeeded his brother Ashur-dan III as king. He ruled during a period of Assyrian decline from which few sources survive. As such his reign, other than broad political developments, is poorly known.

At this time, the Assyrian officials were becoming increasingly powerful relative to the king, and Assyria's enemies were growing more dangerous. An unusually small share of Ashur-nirari's reign was devoted to campaigns against foreign enemies, perhaps suggesting domestic political instability within Assyria. In 746 or 745 BC, there are records of a revolt in Nimrud, the Assyrian capital. Ashur-nirari was succeeded by Tiglath-Pileser III, either his son or brother, but it is unclear in what manner. Though it is traditionally assumed that Tiglath-Pileser deposed Ashur-nirari, it is also possible that it was a smooth and legitimate succession, or that for a brief time they were co-rulers.

== Reign ==
Ashur-nirari V was a son of Adad-nirari III (r. 811–783 BC). He succeeded his brother Ashur-dan III as king of Assyria in 755. Ashur-nirari ruled during an obscure period in Assyrian history, from which little information survives. As a result, his reign is poorly known. During this obscure time, the Neo-Assyrian Empire experienced a period of decline. In particular, the power of the king himself was being threatened due to the emergence of extraordinarily powerful officials, who, while they accepted the authority of the Assyrian monarch, in practice acted with supreme authority and began to write their own cuneiform inscriptions concerning building and political activities, similar to those of the kings. Such inscriptions by officials are more common from this time than inscriptions from the kings themselves. At the same time, the enemies of Assyria grew stronger and more serious. This period of Assyrian decline, for instance, coincided with the peak of the northern Kingdom of Urartu.

Inscriptions from after Ashur-nirari's reign that mention him include the Assyrian King List (from which the length of his reign is known) and a later list of eponyms (year names, typically including the name of an official and a significant event) that include the eponyms of his reign. Contemporary inscriptions that mention Ashur-nirari include an inscription by Sarduri II of Urartu, wherein Sarduri claims to have defeated Ashur-nirari in battle. A fragmentary copy of a treaty between Ashur-nirari and Mati'ilu, king of Arpad, also survives. Also known is a fragmentary description, the only known inscription written under Ashur-nirari himself, which records the grant of lands and tax exemption to the official Marduk-sarra-usur by Ashur-nirari following Marduk-sarra-usur having distinguished himself in a battle. Marduk-sarra-usur might be the same individual as a man of the same name mentioned in the eponym of 784 BC. Based on the list of eponyms, Ashur-nirari's reign was lackluster from a military perspective. The king is recorded to have stayed "in the land" (i.e. not campaigned) for almost every year of his reign, save for only three years. In 755 BC, the year of his accession, he campaigned against Arpad and in 748–747, he campaigned against the city of Namri in Urartu. It is probably from the conclusion of the 755 BC campaign that the treaty with Mati'ilu comes from. Almost all of the surviving portions of this treaty is made up of curses against Mati'ilu. It was customary for an Assyrian king to campaign every year which means that Ashur-nirari staying in Assyria could be a sign of domestic instability. Most Assyrian kings also undertook building projects, but no construction work conducted under Ashur-nirari V is known.

== Succession ==
Ashur-nirari is generally regarded to have died in 745 BC, as this was the year of his successor Tiglath-Pileser III's accession. The nature of Tiglath-Pileser's rise to the throne is not clear, particularly because ancient sources give conflicting accounts of his lineage. The Assyrian King List states that Tiglath-Pileser was the son of Ashur-nirari V, but in his own inscriptions Tiglath-Pileser claimed to be the son of Adad-nirari III and thus Ashur-nirari's brother. Given that there are records of a revolt in Nimrud, the capital of the Assyria, in 746/745 BC, and that Tiglath-Pileser in his inscriptions attributes his rise to the throne as a result of divine selection rather than his royal ancestry, he is typically assumed to have usurped the throne from Ashur-nirari.

In her 2016 PhD thesis, the historian Tracy Davenport advanced the hypothesis that Tiglath-Pileser may have succeeded entirely legitimately and had even briefly been co-ruler with Ashur-nirari. Davenport based this idea primarily on oddities in the sequence of eponyms under Tiglath-Pileser, an unusual horizontal line in the list of eponyms after 744 BC (which might mark Ashur-nirari's death) and the Assyrian King List giving Ashur-nirari a reign lasting 10 years. Since the Assyrians counted reign lengths from the first full year of a king, Ashur-nirari's first year was reckoned to be 754 BC which means he would have ruled for 10 years only if he died in 744 BC. The Assyrian King List is however not without known errors and there are for some earlier kings discrepancies between different versions of the list.

Ashur-nirari V Adaside dynasty Died: 745 BC
Preceded by Ashur-dan III	King of Assyria; 755 – 745 BC	Succeeded by Tiglath-Pileser III
