= Ashur-dan III =

- King of Assyria

King of the Neo-Assyrian Empire
- Reign: 773–755 BC
- Predecessor: Shalmaneser IV
- Successor: Ashur-nirari V
- Died: 755 BC
- Akkadian: Aššur-dān
- Dynasty: Adaside dynasty
- Father: Adad-nirari III

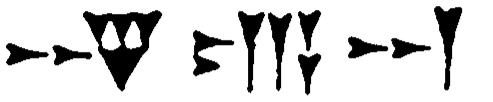
Ashur-dan III (Neo-Assyrian cuneiform: Aššur-dān, meaning "Ashur is strong") was the king of the Neo-Assyrian Empire from 773 BC to his death in 755 BC. Ashur-dan was a son of Adad-nirari III (r. 811–783 BC) and succeeded his brother Shalmaneser IV as king. He ruled during a period of Assyrian decline from which few sources survive. As such his reign, other than broad political developments, is poorly known. At this time, the Assyrian officials were becoming increasingly powerful relative to the king and at the same time, Assyria's enemies were growing more dangerous. Ashur-dan's reign was a particularly difficult one as he was faced with two outbreaks of plague and five of his eighteen years as king were devoted to putting down revolts.

== Reign ==
Ashur-dan III was a son of Adad-nirari III (r. 811–783 BC). He succeeded his brother Shalmaneser IV as king in 773 BC. Shalmaneser IV's reign began an obscure period in Assyrian history from which little information survives, a period that also fully covers Ashur-dan III's reign, which as a result is very poorly known. During this period, the Neo-Assyrian Empire experienced a period of decline. In particular, the power of the king himself was being threatened due to the emergence of extraordinarily powerful officials, whom while they accepted the authority of the Assyrian monarch in practice acted with supreme authority themselves and began to issue their own inscriptions, similar to those of the kings. Such inscriptions by officials are more common from this time than inscriptions from the kings themselves. At the same time, the enemies of Assyria grew stronger. This period of Assyrian decline for instance coincided with the peak of the northern Kingdom of Urartu. It was customary for an Assyrian king to campaign every year, but Ashur-dan stayed in Assyria in four of the years of his reign, perhaps a sign of domestic instability.

Only a single fragmentary royal inscription, on a clay cone, survives from Ashur-dan. This badly preserved inscription describes some restoration work on the main courtyard of the main temple in the city of Assur, dedicated to the Assyrian national god Ashur. Another inscription, a dedication on a bronze statue mentioning the name Ashur-dan, was previously believed to come from Ashur-dan III's time, but it is almost certainly instead from the time of the earlier Ashur-dan I (r. 1179–1134 BC).

Inscriptions from after Ashur-dan's reign that mention him include the Assyrian King List (from which the length of his reign is known) and a later list of eponyms (year names) that include the eponyms of his reign. From the list of eponyms, it is known that Ashur-dan campaigned in Babylonia in 770 BC, against the city of Marad. It is possible that a letter written to the god Ashur from a king in this obscure period refers to this campaign, but it might alternatively have been written in the reign of Shalmaneser IV. Ashur-dan's first campaign, in 772 BC, was against Hatarikka in northern Syria. Given that this city had previously been under Assyrian control, the fact that Ashur-dan had to wage war on it in 772 BC (and in two later campaigns as well) indicates that Assyria's dominion over its westernmost territories was deteriorating. Other early campaigns of Ashur-dan recorded in the eponyms include 771 and 767 BC campaigns against Gananati and a 769 BC campaign against Ituʾa. Both Gananati and Ituʾa were probably cities in Babylonia. In 766, Ashur-dan campaigned against the Medes and in 765 he again warred against Hatarikka.

=== Epidemics ===
After 765 BC, the eponyms suggest a very unstable time. Plague is reported in both 765 and 759 BC and a revolt in the Assyrian heartland is recorded from 763 to 762 BC, a revolt in Arrapḫa 761–760 BC and a revolt in Guzana 759–758 BC until peace was at last restored in 758 BC. Perhaps the many revolts were in response to the plague epidemic as well as The Bur-Sagale solar eclipse on 15 June 763 BC. Solar eclipses, especially full eclipses that were visible to everyone in the empire (as was the case for this eclipse) were always interpreted as bad omens, and as such the epidemic and the eclipse may have been interpreted as the gods withdrawing their divine support for Ashur-dan's rule. The last campaign noted in the eponyms is a third campaign to Hatarikka in 755. It is probable that some, or perhaps even all, of the campaigns were actually led by Shamshi-ilu, rather than the king. Ashur-dan died in 755 BC and was succeeded by his brother, Ashur-nirari V.

=== Solar Eclipse of 763 BCE ===
The Bur-Sagale solar eclipse on 15 June 763 BC was a full solar eclipse visible throughout the Assyrian Empire. It functions as an anchor for the limmu dates.

== Titles ==
In the clay cone from Assur, Ashur-dan is accorded the following titulature:

Ashur-dan, appointee of the god Enlil, vice-regent [of Ashur, son of] Adad-nirari, appointee of the god Enlil, vice-regent of [Ashur, son of] Shamshi-Adad, [(who was) also] appointee of the god Enlil and vice-regent of [Ashur].

Ashur-dan III Adaside dynasty Died: 755 BC
| Preceded by Shalmaneser IV | King of Assyria; 773 – 755 BC | Succeeded by Ashur-nirari V |
