= Adad-nirari III =

Adad-nīrārī III
- King of Assyria; King of the Universe
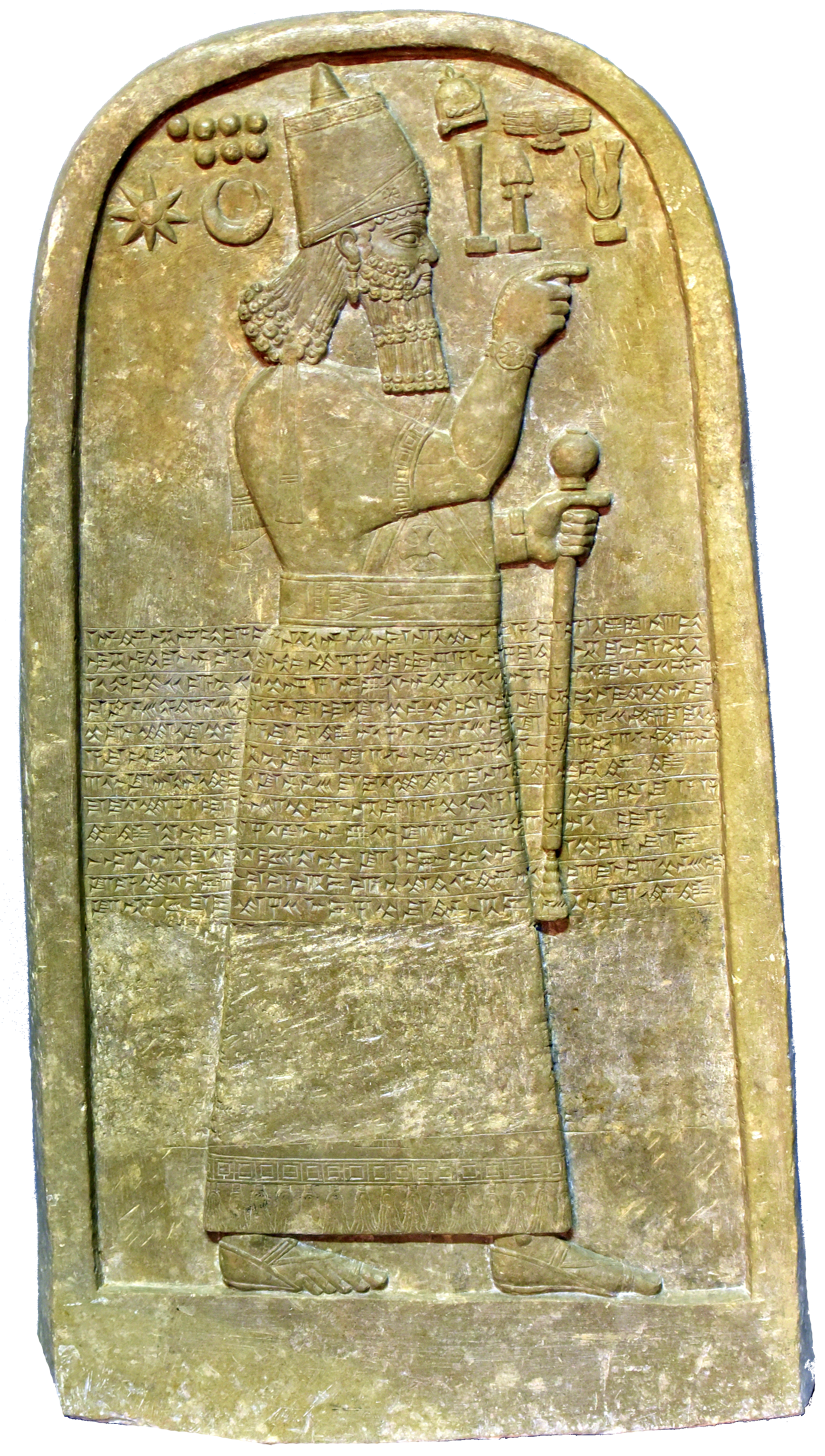
- The Tell al-Rimah Stele was discovered in 1967 and commemorates Adad-nirari III’s campaigns in the West.

King of the Neo-Assyrian Empire
- Reign: 811–783 BC
- Predecessor: Shamshi-Adad V
- Successor: Shalmaneser IV
- Died: 783 BC
- Issue: Ashur-nirari V Shalmaneser IV; Ashur-dan III; Tiglath-Pileser III?
- Father: Shamshi-Adad V
- Mother: Shammuramat

Adad-nīrārī III (also Adad-nārārī, meaning "Adad (the storm god) is my help") was the King of Assyria from 811 to 783 BC. (Note: This assumes that the longer version of the Assyrian Eponym List, which has an additional eponym for Adad-nīrārī III, is the correct one. For the shorter eponym list the ascension year would be 810 BC.)

== Family ==
Adad-nīrārī was a son and successor of king Shamshi-Adad V, and was apparently quite young at the time of his accession, because for the first five years of his reign, his mother Shammuramat was highly influential, which has given rise to the legend of Semiramis.

It is widely rejected that his mother acted as regent, but she was surprisingly influential for the time period.

He was the father of kings Ashur-nirari V, Shalmaneser IV, and Ashur-dan III. Tiglath-Pileser III described himself as a son of Adad-nīrārī in his inscriptions, but it is uncertain if this is true.

== Biography ==
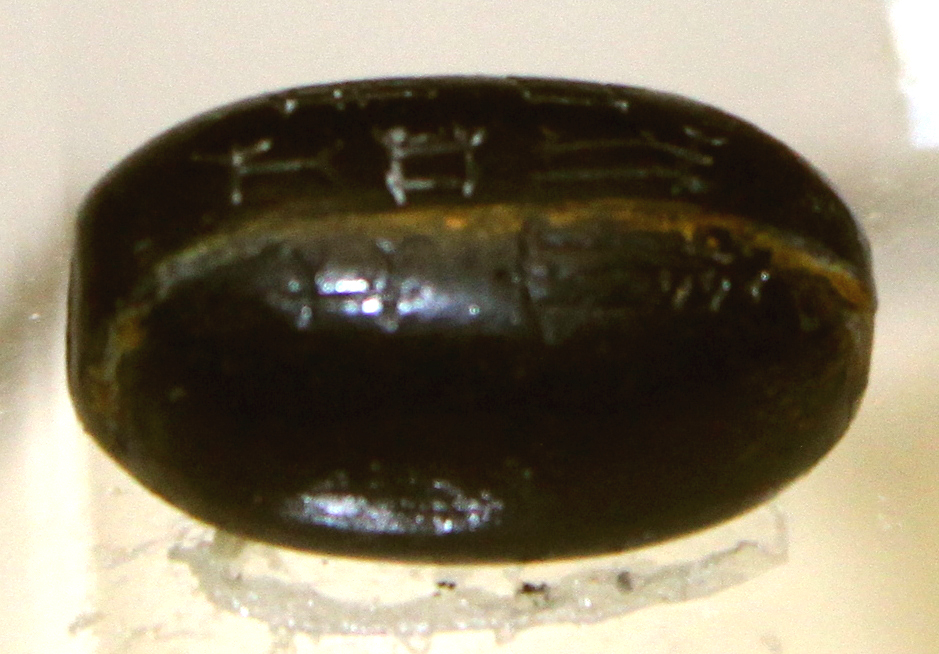
Agate beads with the name Adad-nārārī III from Khojaly: Manneans period in the National Museum of History of Azerbaijan.

Adad-nīrārī's youth, and the struggles his father had faced early in his reign, caused a serious weakening of Assyrian rulership over their indigenous Mesopotamia, and made way for the ambitions of officers, governors, and local rulers.

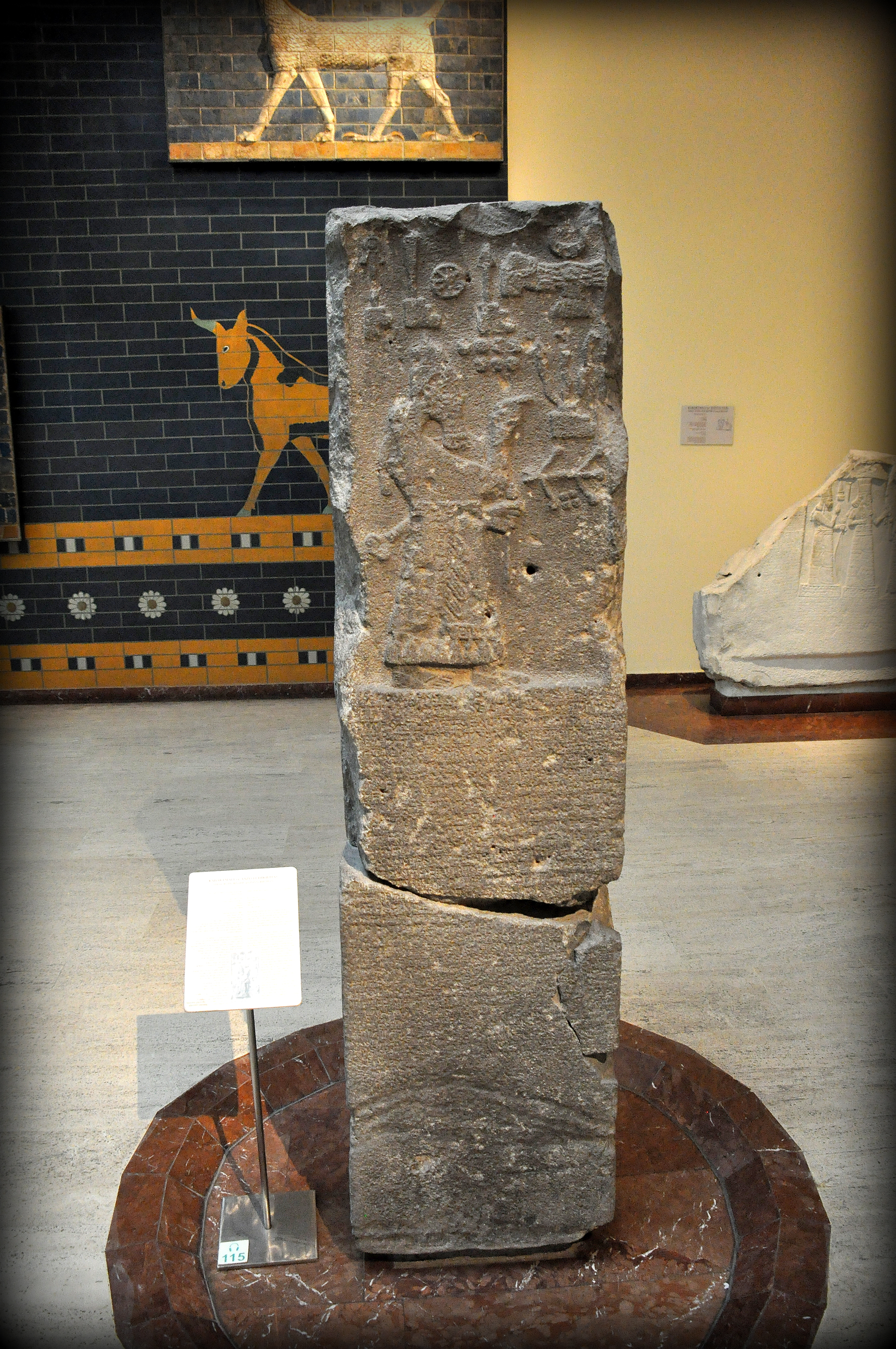
Basalt stele of the Assyrian king Adad-nirari III from Saba. Ancient Orient Museum, Istanbul Archeological Museums, Turkey

According to Adad-nīrārī's inscriptions, he led several military campaigns with the purpose of regaining the strength Assyria enjoyed in the times of his grandfather Shalmaneser III.

According to the eponym canon, he campaigned in all directions until the last of his 28 years of reign (783 BC), and he was the builder of the temple of Nabu at Nineveh. Among his actions was a siege of Damascus in the time of Ben-Hadad III in 796 BC, which led to the eclipse of the Aramaean Kingdom of Damascus and allowed the recovery of Israel under Jehoash (who paid the Assyrian king tribute at this time) and Jeroboam II.

Despite Adad-nīrārī's vigour, Assyria entered a several-decades-long period of weakness following his death.

== See also ==
- Calah Slab
- Saba'a Stele
- Shamshi-ilu
- Tell al-Rimah stela

== Notes ==
Preceded by Shamshi-Adad V	King of Assyria; 811–783 BC	Succeeded by Shalmaneser IV
