= Arpad, Syria =

Ancient city

Arpad
- Location within Syria
- 36.47°N 37.10°E
- Location: Syria
- Region: Aleppo Governorate

Arpad (Old Aramaic: 𐡀𐡓𐡐𐡃, romanized: ʾrpd; Biblical Hebrew: אַרְפַּד, romanized: ʾArpaḏ or אַרְפָּד, ʾArpāḏ; modern Tell Rifaat, Syria) was an ancient Aramaean Neo-Hittite city located in north-western Syria, north of Aleppo. It became the capital of the Aramaean state of Bit Agusi established by Gusi of Yakhan in the 9th century BC. Bit Agusi stretched from the A'zaz area in the north to Hamath in the south.

Arpad later became a major vassal city of the Kingdom of Urartu. In 743 BC, during the Urartu-Assyria War, the Neo-Assyrian king Tiglath-Pileser III laid siege to Arpad following the defeat of the Urartuan army of Sarduri II at Samsat. But the city of Arpad did not surrender easily. It took Tiglath-Pileser three years of siege to conquer Arpad, whereupon he massacred its inhabitants and destroyed the city. Afterward Arpad served as a provincial capital. Tell Rifaat, which is probably the remains of Arpad, has walls still preserved to a height of eight meters.

== Biblical references ==
The city is mentioned several times in the Hebrew Bible:

- 2 Kings 18:34; 19:13
- Isaiah 10:9; 36:19; 37:13
- Jeremiah 49:23, within the oracle against Damascus, one of the poetic "oracles against foreign nations" found in the later chapters of the Book of Jeremiah.

The Assyrian vizier, Rabshakeh, lists the god(s) of Arpad among those who he alleges have been unable to save their cities from Assyrian assault.

== Etymology ==
The word Arpad in Hebrew means 'the light of redemption', or 'I shall be spread out (or: supported)'

== Archaeology ==
Tel Rifaat is an oval 250 by 233 meters. Within this, the main citadel is 142 by 142 meters with a maximum height of 30 meters. The defensive wall surrounding the site is about two miles long.

The site has been worked by a team from the Institute of Archaeology or the University of London. After a preliminary examination in 1956, Tell Rifa'at was excavated for two seasons in 1961 and 1964. The team was led by Veronica Seton-Williams.

In 1977, an archaeological survey was conducted of the area around Tell Rifa'at, also by the Institute of Archaeology.

== See also ==
- Cities of the ancient Near East
