= Eponym dating system =

Calendar system used in ancient Assyria

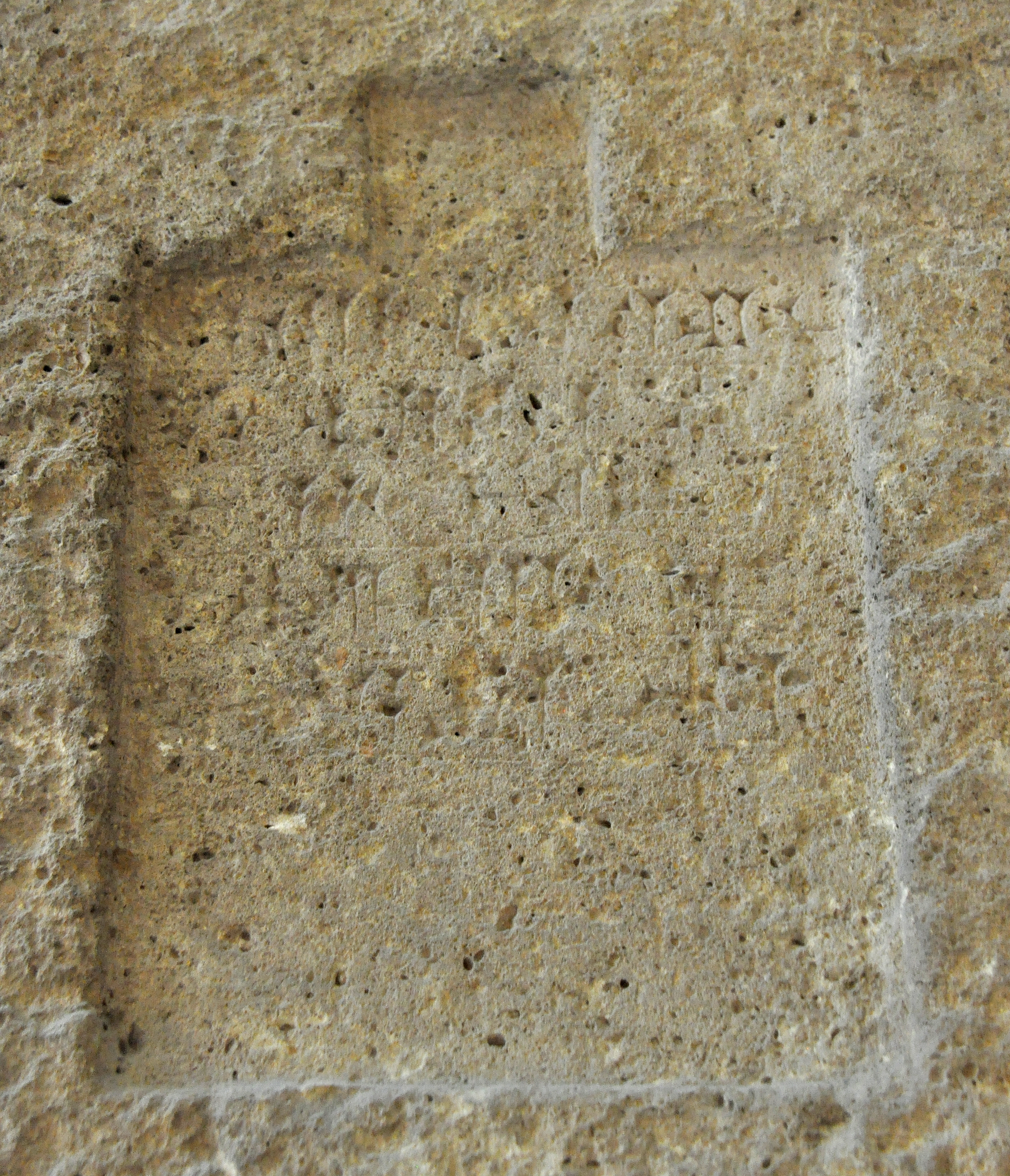
Detail. Stele of Shamsh-bel-usur, limmu of the years 864 and 851 BCE. From Assur, Iraq. Pergamon Museum

In the history of Assyria, the eponym dating system was a calendar system for Assyria, for a period of over one thousand years. Every year was associated with the name, an eponym, of the Limmu, the official who led that year's New Year festival.

The dating system is thought to have originated in the ancient city of Assur, and remained the official dating system in Assyria until the end of the Assyrian Empire in the seventh century BC. The names of the limmu who became eponyms were originally chosen by lot sortition, until the first millennium it became a fixed rotation of officers headed by the king who constituted the limmu. The earliest known attestations of a year eponyms are at Karum-Kanesh, and became used in other Assyrian colonies in Anatolia. Its spread was due to Shamshi-Adad I's unification of northern Mesopotamia.

== Old Assyrian eponym lists ==
A number of Old Assyrian limmu lists have been combined into the so-called Revised Eponym List (REL), which spans a period of 255 years in the early second millennium BCE (1972-1718 BCE in the Middle Chronology dating system). The central figure of this period was Šamšī-Adad I who conquered Aššur in the year REL 165, and reigned Assyria until his death in REL 197. In the Middle Chronology system his reign corresponds to the years 1808-1776 BCE.

The absolute chronology of this period has long been controversial. That the Middle Chronology is indeed correct, and not one of the rival absolute chronologies, is supported by a combined dendrochronological (tree-ring) and radiocarbon (^{14}C) data analysis, which narrows down the year Šamšī-Adad died to between 1776 and 1768 BCE. In addition, it is known that in the year after his birth (ca. REL 127) a partial solar eclipse was observed, and this fits in with an eclipse on August 5, 1845, BCE.

== Late Assyrian eponym lists ==
With the establishment of eponym lists, succinct statements about events were sometimes added in order to keep track of the sequence. The most well-known limmu lists run from 911 through to 631 BC, and have been dated with the aid of the Canon of Ptolemaeus, which coincides with dates from the Canon between 747 and 631 BC. According to one limmu list, a solar eclipse occurred in the tenth reigning year of the Assyrian king Aššur-dan III, in the month of Sivan (May–June on the Gregorian calendar), by Bur-Sagale. Using the Canon of Kings the tenth year can be dated to 763 BC, and modern astronomy dating has backed the Assyrian eclipse up as June 15, 763 BC. Other events can be dated from this establishment of fact, such as the taking of the Egyptian city of Thebes by the Assyrians in 664 BC, and to be able to determine the date of the minting of ancient coins.

Out of 19 surviving clay tablets with limmus, they between them show ten manuscripts that contain lists of years identified by the eponym with a summary note about what happened that year, most often military campaigns. Thus, such lists provide historians a way of dating long stretches of the Neo-Assyrian history, and give us in details military exploits and which were considered the most important. Such a translation can be found below (With BC added).

Year	Limmu	Event
719 BC	Sargon, King [of Assyria]	[-ent]ered
718 BC	Zer-ibni, governor of Ra[sappa]	[to Ta]bal
717 BC	Tab-shar-Assur, chamberlain	[Dur-Sharru]kin was founded.
716 BC	Tab-sil-Eshara, governor of the citadel	[Against the ci]ty of the Manneans.
715 BC	Taklal-ana-beli, governor of Nasibina	[ ] governors appointed
714 BC	Ishtar-duri, governor of Arrapha	[to Ur]artu, Musasir, Haldia
713 BC	Assur-bani, governor of Kalhu	[... the no]bles in Ellipi; [the god/goddess ...] entered (his/her) new [tem]ple; [again]st the city Muṣaṣir. (The king stayed) in the land (Assyria)
712 BC	Sharru-emuranni, governor of Zamua	in the land
711 BC	Ninurta-alik-pani, governor of Si'mme	[to] Marqasa
710 BC	Shamash-belu-usur, governor of Arzuhina	to Bit-zeri, the king stayed at Kish
709 BC	Mannu-ki-Assur-le'i, governor of Tille	Sargon took the hands of Bel
708 BC	Shamash-upahhir, governor of Habruri	Kummuhi conquered and a governor was appointed
707 BC	Sha-Assur-dubbu, governor of Tushan	the king returned from Babylon, the vizier and nobles, the booty of Dur-Jakin was destroyed, on the 22nd of Teshrit, the gods of Dur-Sharrukin entered the temples
706 BC	Mutakkil-Assur, governor of Guzana	the king stayed in the land, the nobles [ ]. on the 6th of Ayar, Dur-Sharrukin was completed
705 BC	Nashur-Bel, governor of Amidu	the king [ ] against Qurdi the Kullumean, the king was killed, the camp of the king of Assyria [ ]. on the 12th of Ab, Sennacherib [became] king

== See also ==
- Eponymous archon
- Roman consular dating
- Chronology of the ancient Near East

== Bibliography ==
- The Eponyms of the Assyrian Empire, Alan Millard.
- A History of the Ancient Near East ca. 3000-323 BC, second edition, Marc Van de Mieroop.
- Ancient Iraq, Georges Roux.
