= Amber Road =

Historical trade route in Europe

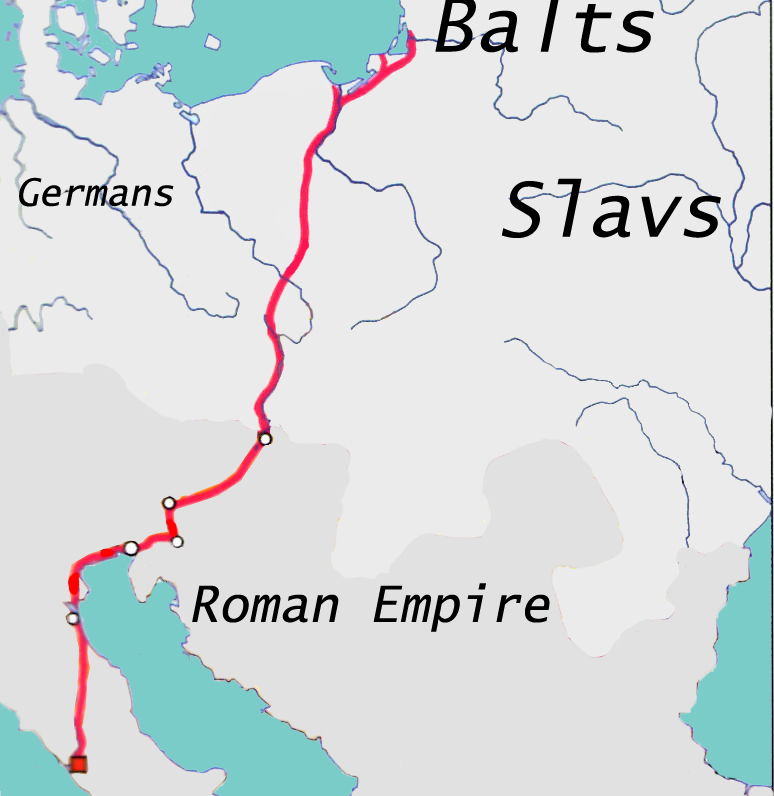
The ancient route from the Baltic Sea to the areas of the Roman Empire by the Mediterranean Sea

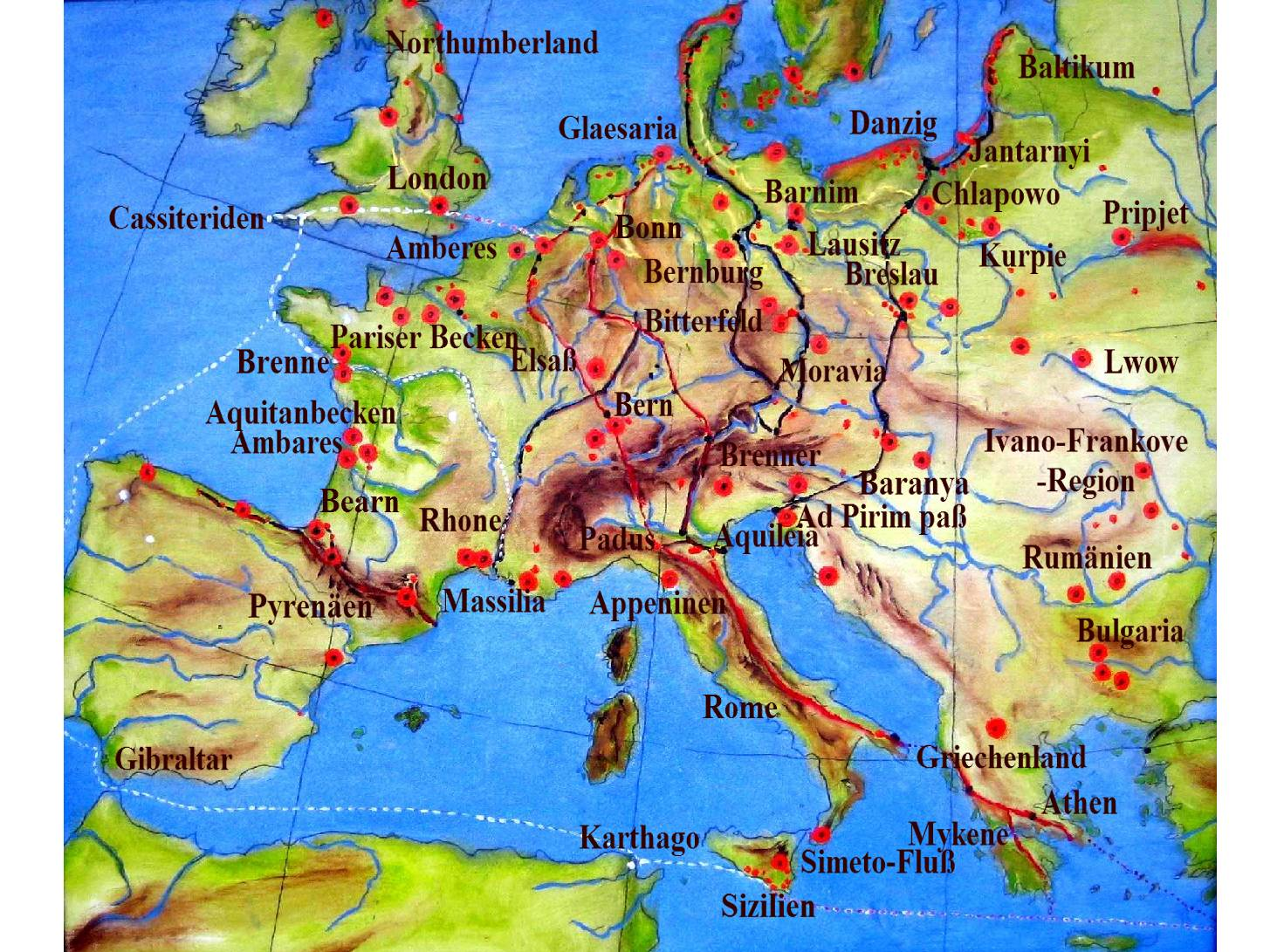
Amber deposits in Europe

The Amber Road was an ancient trade route for the transfer of amber from coastal areas of the North Sea and the Baltic Sea to the Mediterranean Sea. Prehistoric trade routes between Northern and Southern Europe were defined by the amber trade.

As an important commodity, sometimes dubbed "the gold of the north", amber was transported from the North Sea and Baltic Sea coasts overland by way of the Vistula and Dnieper rivers to Italy, Greece, the Black Sea, Syria and Egypt over a period of thousands of years.

The route developed into an important trading and military route for the Roman Empire, and also formed the basis of several present-day transport routes.

== Antiquity ==
The oldest trade in amber started from Sicily. The Sicilian amber trade was directed to Greece, North Africa and Spain. Sicilian amber was also discovered in Mycenae by the archaeologist Heinrich Schliemann, and it appeared in sites in southern Spain and Portugal. Its distribution is similar to that of ivory, so it is possible that amber from Sicily reached the Iberian Peninsula through contacts with North Africa. After a decline in the consumption and trade of amber at the beginning of the Bronze Age, around 2000 BC, the influence of Baltic amber gradually took the place of Sicilian amber throughout the Iberian Peninsula from around 1000 BC. The new evidence comes from various archaeological and geological locations on the Iberian Peninsula.

From at least the 16th century BC, amber was moved from Northern Europe to the Mediterranean area. The breast ornament of the Egyptian Pharaoh Tutankhamen (c. 1333–1324 BC) contains large Baltic amber beads. Schliemann found Baltic amber beads at Mycenae, as shown by spectroscopic investigation. The quantity of amber in the Royal Hypogeum of Qatna, in Syria, is unparalleled among known second millennium BC sites in the Levant and the Ancient Near East. Amber was sent from the North Sea to the Temple of Apollo at Delphi as an offering. From the Black Sea, trade could continue to Asia along the Silk Road, another ancient trade route.

In Roman times, a main route ran south from the Baltic coast (modern Lithuania), the entire north–south length of modern-day Poland (likely through the Iron Age settlement of Biskupin), through the land of the Boii (modern Czech Republic and Slovakia) to the head of the Adriatic Sea (Aquileia by the modern Gulf of Venice). Other commodities were exported to the Romans along with amber, such as animal fur and skin, honey, and wax, in exchange for Roman glass, brass, gold, and non-ferrous metals such as tin and copper imported into the early Baltic region. As this road was a lucrative trade route connecting the Baltic Sea to the Mediterranean Sea, Roman military fortifications were constructed along the route to protect merchants and traders from Germanic raids.

The Old Prussian towns of Kaup and Truso on the Baltic were the starting points of the route to the south. In Scandinavia the amber road probably gave rise to the thriving Nordic Bronze Age culture, bringing influences from the Mediterranean Sea to the northernmost countries of Europe.

Whilst called the Amber Road, the prized gemstone was the smallest share of goods transported along the route.

== Known roads by country ==
EV9 The Amber Route is a long-distance cycling route between Gdańsk, Poland, and Pula, Croatia, which follows the course of the Amber Road.

=== Austria ===
Near the villages of Petronell-Carnuntum and Bad Deutsch-Altenburg, the Roman ruins of Carnuntum mark a major trading site of the Amber Road and also the Limes Road.

=== Belgium ===
A small section led southwards from Antwerp and Bruges to the towns Braine-l'Alleud and Braine-le-Comte, both originally named "Brennia-Brenna". The route continued by following the Meuse towards Bern in Switzerland.

=== Estonia ===
In Estonia, the old coastal Amber road route is going north-south along the E67 highway from Reiu in Häädemeeste Parish of Pärnu County, where it continues as 331 local road between Rannametsa and Ikla villages.

=== France and Spain ===
Routes connected amber finding locations at Ambares (near Bordeaux), leading to Béarn and the Pyrenees. Routes connecting the amber finding locations in northern Spain and in the Pyrenees were a trading route to the Mediterranean Sea.

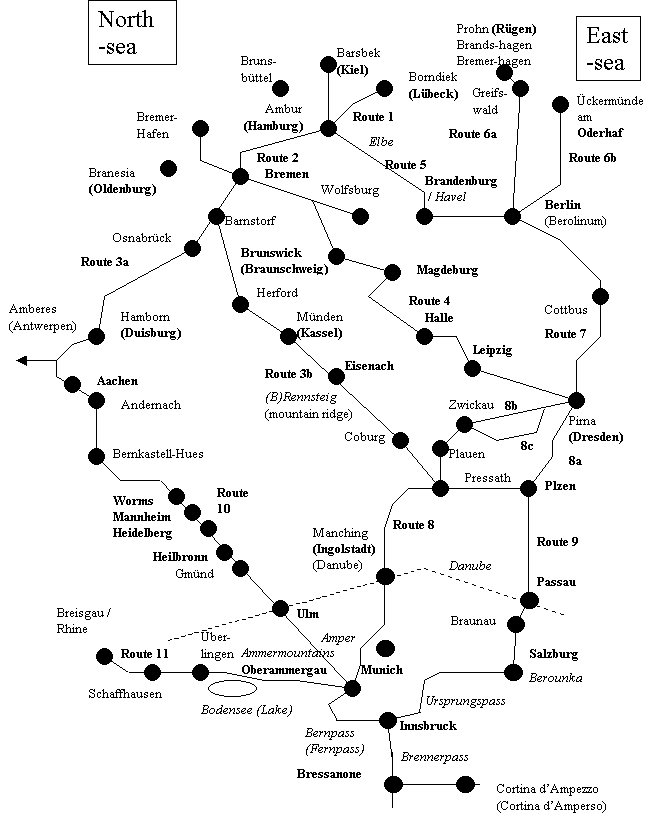
Amber Roads in Germany

=== Germany ===
Several roads connected the North Sea and Baltic Sea, especially the city of Hamburg to the Brenner Pass, proceeding southwards to Brindisi (nowadays Italy) and Ambracia (nowadays Greece).

=== Italy ===
In northern Italy, Aquileia was a major Roman city and near one end of the road where amber was found, and also shaped.

=== Netherlands ===
A small section, including Baarn, Barneveld, Amersfoort and Amerongen, connected the North Sea with the Lower Rhine.

=== Poland ===
The shortest (and possibly oldest) road avoids alpine areas and led from the Baltic coastline (nowadays Lithuania and Poland), through Biskupin, Milicz, Wrocław, the Kłodzko Valley (less often through the Moravian Gate), crossed the Danube near Carnuntum in the Noricum province, headed southwest past Poetovio, Celeia, Emona, Nauportus, and reached Patavium and Aquileia at the Adriatic coast. One of the oldest directions of the last stage of the Amber Road to the south of the Danube, noted in the myth about the Argonauts, used the rivers Sava and Kupa, ending with a short continental road from Nauportus to Tarsatica in Rijeka on the coast of the Adriatic.

=== Slovenia ===
Coming from Aquileia (Italy), the Roman city of Emona (now within the Slovenian capital of Ljubljana) was on the south-west to north-east route, continuing to Celeia (now-Celje) and Poetovio (now-Ptuj), before going onto Scarbantia (now Sopron, Hungary). Novo Mesto in southern Slovenia was also involved in the amber trade.

=== Switzerland ===
The Swiss region indicates a number of alpine roads, concentrating around the capital city Bern and probably originating from the banks of the Rhône and Rhine.

== Modern usage ==
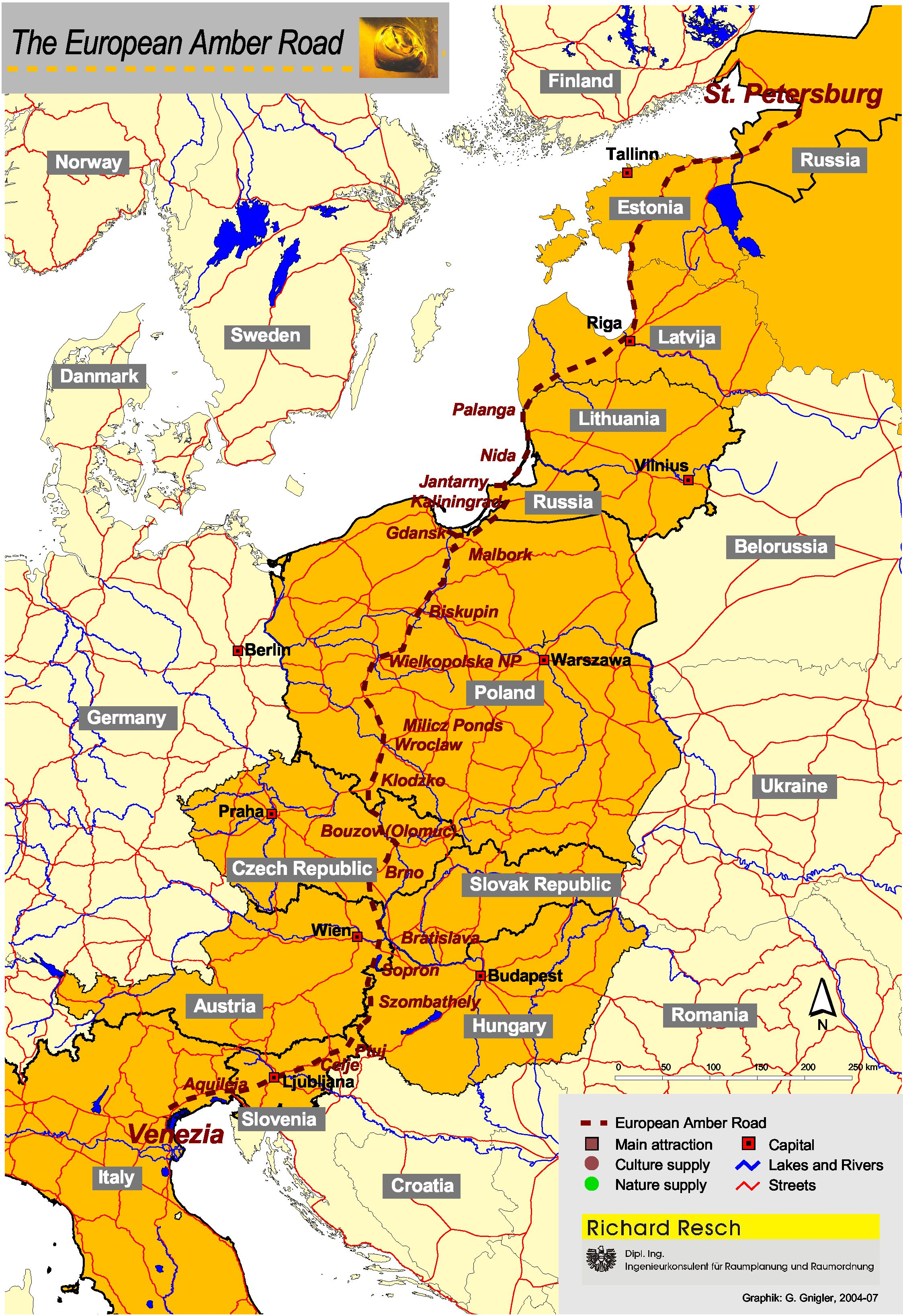
The Amber Road (east route), as hypothesized by Polish historian Jerzy Wielowiejski, Główny szlak bursztynowy w czasach Cesarstwa Rzymskiego (transl. Main Route of the Amber Road of the Roman Empire), 1980

There is an unofficial set of tourist sites stretching on a route along the Baltic coast from Gdańsk, Poland to Pärnu, Estonia called the "Amber Road". Notable "Amber Road" sites on the route include:

- Amber museum in Gdańsk;
- Kaliningrad Regional Amber Museum, Russia;
- Mizgiris Amber Gallery-Museum in Nida, Lithuania;
- The "Amber Bay" in Juodkrantė, Lithuania;
- Lithuania Minor History Museum;
- Amber collection site in Karklė, Lithuania;
- Palanga Amber Museum in Palanga, Lithuania;
- Open amber workshop in Palanga;
- Samogitian Alka in Šventoji, Lithuania.

Dating from the 1st century BC amber deposit found in Partynice near Wrocław. It is the world's largest archaeological find of amber, estimated at 1,240–1,760 kilograms (2,730–3,880 lb). Currently it is in the Archaeological Museum in Wrocław.

In Poland, the north–south motorway A1 is officially named Amber Highway.

In Russian, Kaliningrad Oblast is occasionally referred to as 'the amber region' (Янтарный край).

The StudyEU Amber Road European University Alliance is a university network linked to the ancient route, formed to strengthen international cooperation and cohesion.

The modern Baltic–Adriatic Corridor connects the two seas along routes that roughly follow the Amber Road.
