= Qatna =

Archaeological site in Syria

- تل المشرفة (Arabic)
- Tell el-Mishrife
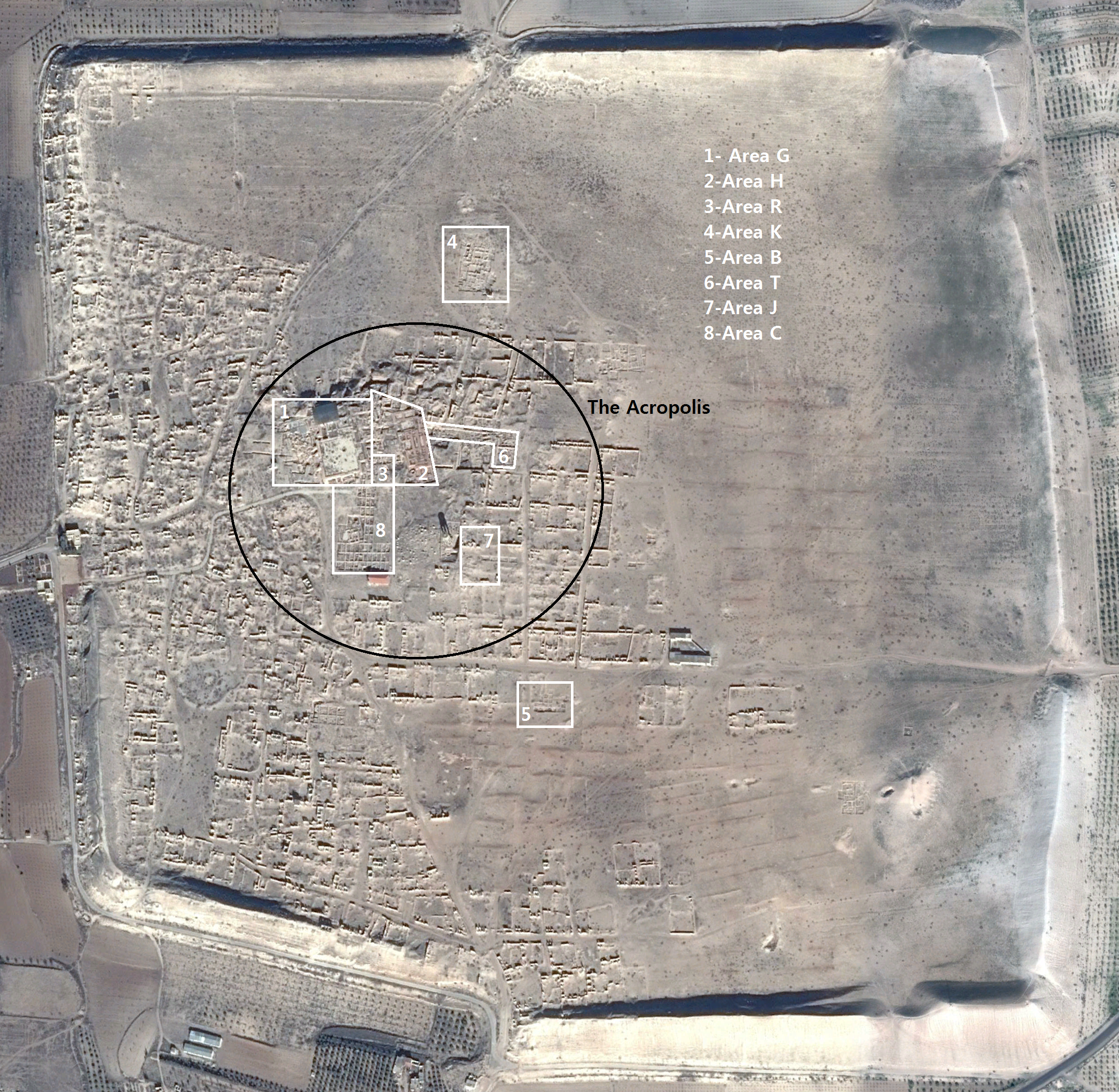
- A satellite image of Qatna with the archaeological sites marked

- Location within Syria
- 34°50′06″N 36°51′57″E
- Type: Settlement
- Periods: Bronze Age, Iron Age
- Cultures: Amorite, Aramean
- Location: al-Mishrifeh, Homs Governorate, Syria

History
- Built: c. 3300 BC
- Abandoned: 1982

Site notes
- Excavation dates: 1924, 1927–1929, 1994, 1999–2011
- Archaeologists: Robert du Mesnil du Buisson, Michel Al-Maqdissi, Daniele Morandi Bonacossi and Peter Pfälzner
- Condition: Ruined
- Owner: Public
- Public access: Yes
- Website: http://www.qatna.de/

Qatna (modern: Arabic: تل المشرفة, Tell al-Mishrifeh; also Tell Misrife or Tell Mishrifeh) was an ancient city located in Homs Governorate, Syria. Its remains constitute a tell situated about 18 km (11 mi) northeast of Homs near the village of al-Mishrifeh. The city was an important center through most of the 2nd millennium BC and in the first half of the 1st millennium BC. It contained one of the largest royal palaces of Bronze Age in Syria and has an intact royal tomb that has provided a great amount of archaeological evidence on the funerary habits of that period.

First inhabited for a short period in the second half of the 4th millennium BC, it was repopulated around 2800 BC and continued to grow. Around 2000 BC, it became the capital of a regional kingdom that spread its authority over large swaths of the central and southern Levant. The kingdom enjoyed good relations with Mari, but was engaged in constant warfare against Yamhad. By the 15th century BC, Qatna lost its hegemony and came under the authority of Mitanni. It later changed hands between the former and Egypt, until it was conquered and sacked by the Hittites in the late 14th century BC. Following its destruction, the city was reduced in size before being abandoned by the 13th century BC. It was resettled in the 10th century BC, becoming a center of the kingdoms of Palistin then Hamath until it was destroyed by the Assyrians in 720 BC, which reduced it to a small village that eventually disappeared in the 6th century BC. In the 19th century, the site was populated by villagers who were evacuated into the newly built village of al-Mishrifeh in 1982. The site has been excavated since the 1920s.

Qatna was inhabited by different peoples, most importantly the Amorites, who established the kingdom, followed by the Arameans; Hurrians became part of the society in the 15th century BC and influenced Qatna's written language. The city's art is distinctive and shows signs of contact with different surrounding regions. The artifacts of Qatna show high-quality workmanship. The city's religion was complex and based on many cults in which ancestor worship played an important role. Qatna's location in the middle of the Near East trade networks helped it achieve wealth and prosperity; it traded with regions as far away as the Baltic and Afghanistan. The area surrounding Qatna was fertile, with abundant water, which made the lands suitable for grazing and supported a large population that contributed to the prosperity of the city.

== Etymology ==
3rd millennium texts do not mention the name Qatna; the archive of Ebla mentions the toponym "Gudadanum" (or "Ga-da-nu"), which has been identified with Qatna by some scholars, such as Giovanni Pettinato and Michael Astour, but this is debated.

Aside from an obscure passage in the 20th-century BC Egyptian Story of Sinuhe, where the name Qatna is not clearly mentioned, the earliest occurrence of the name comes from the Middle Bronze Age archive of Mari, where the city is mentioned as "Qatanum", an Akkadianized format (^{āl}Qa-ta-nim^{ki}). In Alalakh, the name "Qa-ta-na" was used, an Amorite format that was shortened into Qatna during the Late Bronze Age. The name is Semitic; it derives from the root q-ṭ-n, meaning "thin" or "narrow" in a number of Semitic languages such as Akkadian, Syriac, and Ethiopian. "Ga-da-nu" from the Eblaite archive may also derive from that root. The toponym "Qatna" is strictly related to waterways and lakes; this could be a reference to the artificial narrowing that created a lake from the springs located southwest of the city, since Qatna grew on the eastern shore of a now dried-up lake.

== Site ==
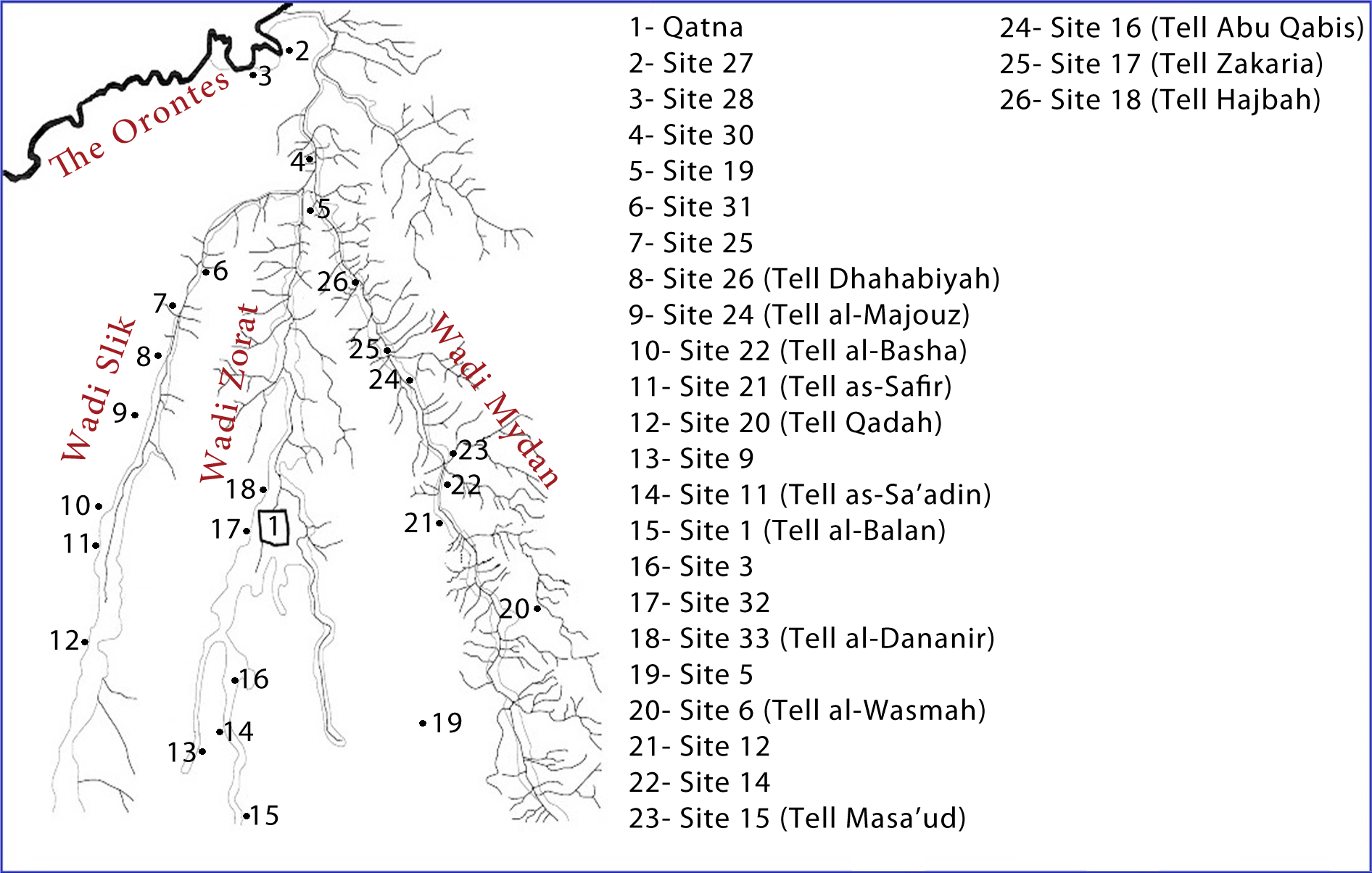
The region of Qatna

The city is located in the countryside, 18 km (11 mi) north of Homs. It was founded on a limestone plateau, and its extensive remains suggest fertile surroundings with abundant water, which is not the case in modern times. Three northward flowing tributary wadis (Mydan, Zorat and Slik) of the Orontes River cross the region of Qatna, enclosing an area 26 km (16 mi) north–south and 19 km (12 mi) east–west. The city lay along the central wadi (Zorat), surrounded by at least twenty five satellite settlements, most of them along the Mydan (marking the eastern border of the region) and Slik (marking the western border of the region) wadis. The wadis are now dry most of the year, but during the rainy season their discharge is disproportional to the size of their valleys, suggesting that the region was much more humid and water was more abundant in the past. The early city, dating to the Early Bronze Age IV (2200–2100 BC), was built in a circular plan; this circular site became the upper city (acropolis) of Qatna's later phases and was surrounded by a lower rectangular city.

=== Qatna's landmarks ===
==== Palaces ====
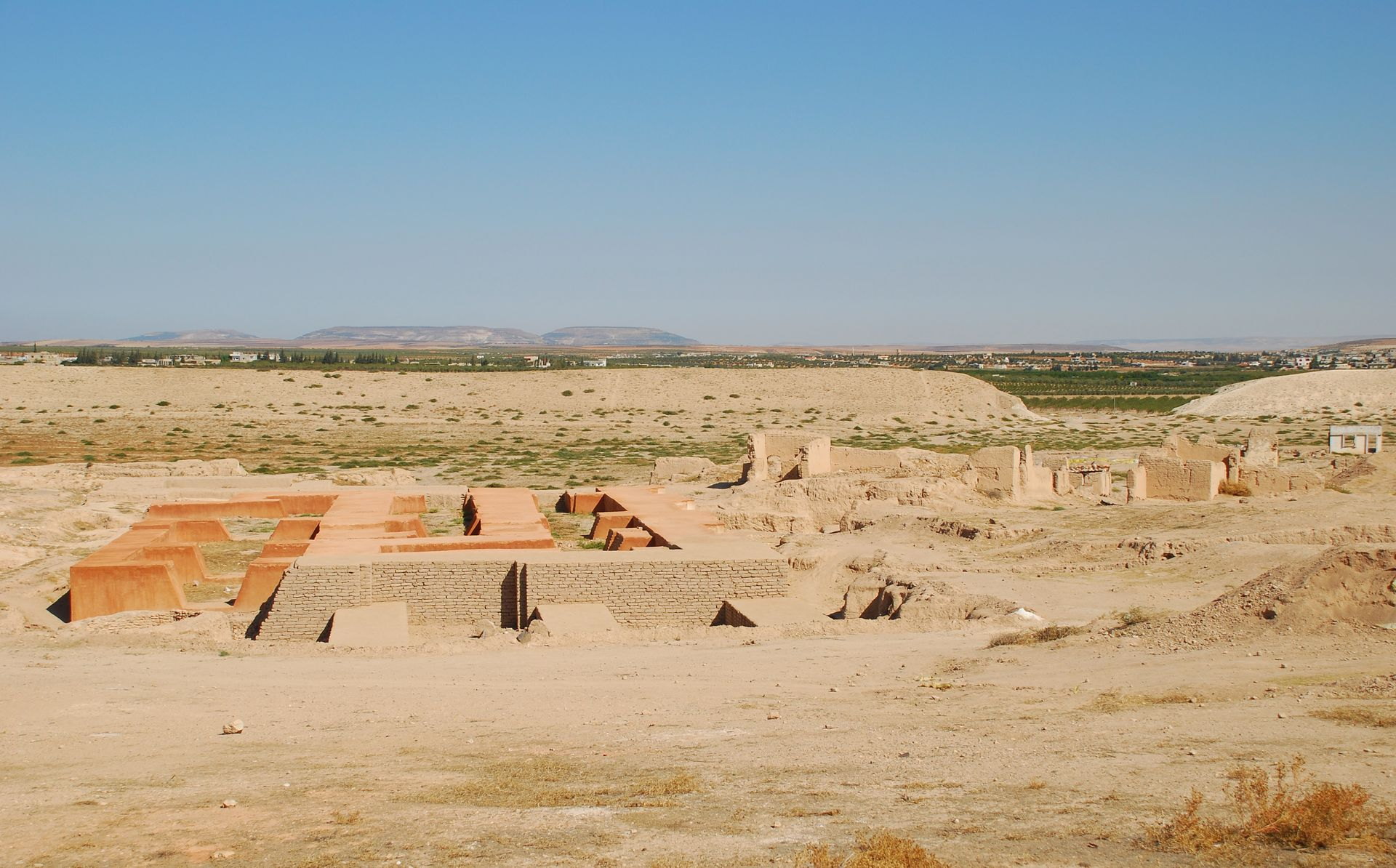
The royal palace (area H)

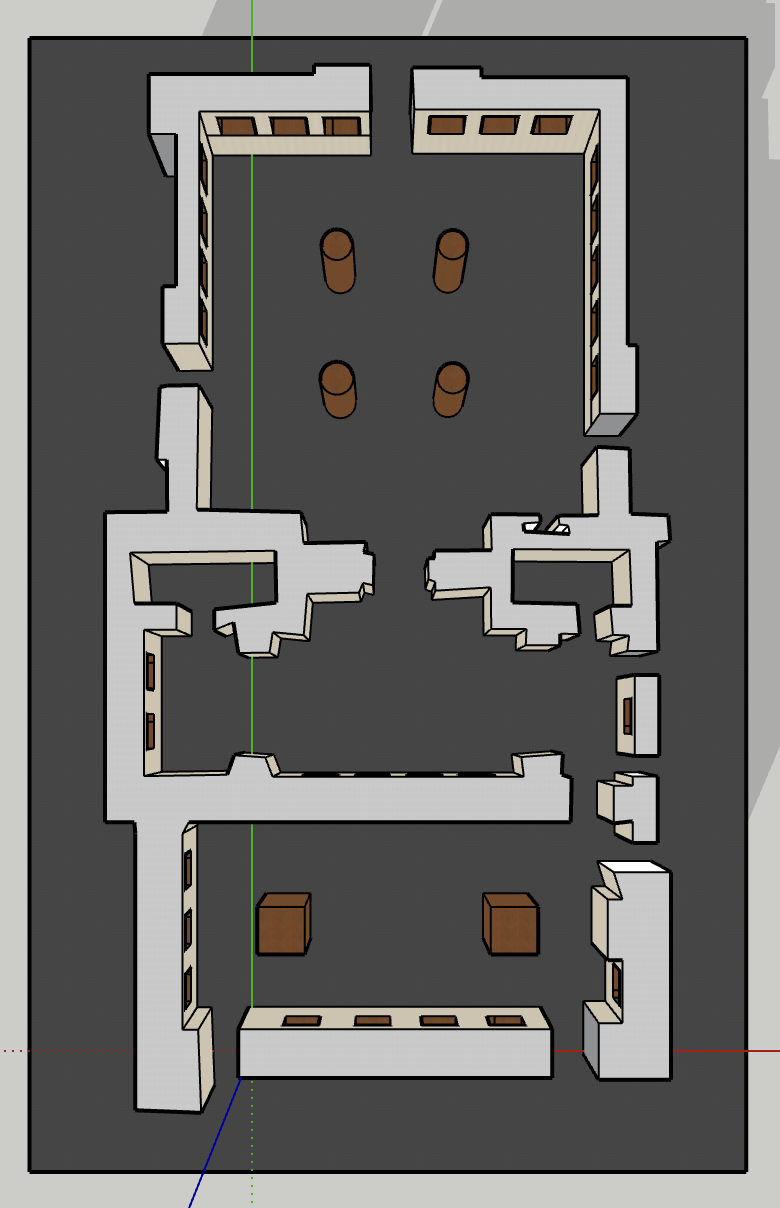
- Floor plan of Qatna's Central Representative Unit (Halls A, B, and C)
  Building 8. The structure is dated to the transition period between the third and second millennia BC, and was abandoned in the late Middle Bronze Age II (1800–1600 BC). Its walls, which are still preserved, are 7.5 metres (25 ft) tall and 4 metres (13 ft) wide. The function of the building is not known, but its monumental nature and location on the upper city's summit, plus the existence of a pair of royal statues in it, suggest that it might have been a royal palace, especially since it preceded the erection of the main Royal palace of Qatna. In the 1970s, a concrete water tower was built to supply the modern village of al-Mushrifah; the new structure destroyed the eastern and northern walls of the building.
- The construction of Qatna's Royal Palace was commissioned by the kings Išḫi-Addu and Amud-pi-El, two powerful rulers during Middle Bronze Age Syria. The palace was to be a physical representation of their strong identity, power, and control within the region. The Royal Palace was completed between 1790 and 1760 BC, the peak of the regional Syrian kingdom's power, before later becoming an Egyptian vassal and finally conquered by the Hittite kingdom towards the end of the Bronze Age. Though the palace was occupied by several empires throughout its existence, its architectural formal qualities maintained consistency until its destruction in 1340 BC. Qatna's royal palace was fully explored and exposed by the collaborative efforts of the national Syrian, Syro-Italian, and Syro-German teams. These excavations dating from 1999–2010 helped uncover new interpretations of the palace's rooms and their function. Capturing the full scale of the Royal Palace, the documentations were known to clash against the original discoveries of the Count Robert du Mesnil du Buisson's original excavation in the 1920s.
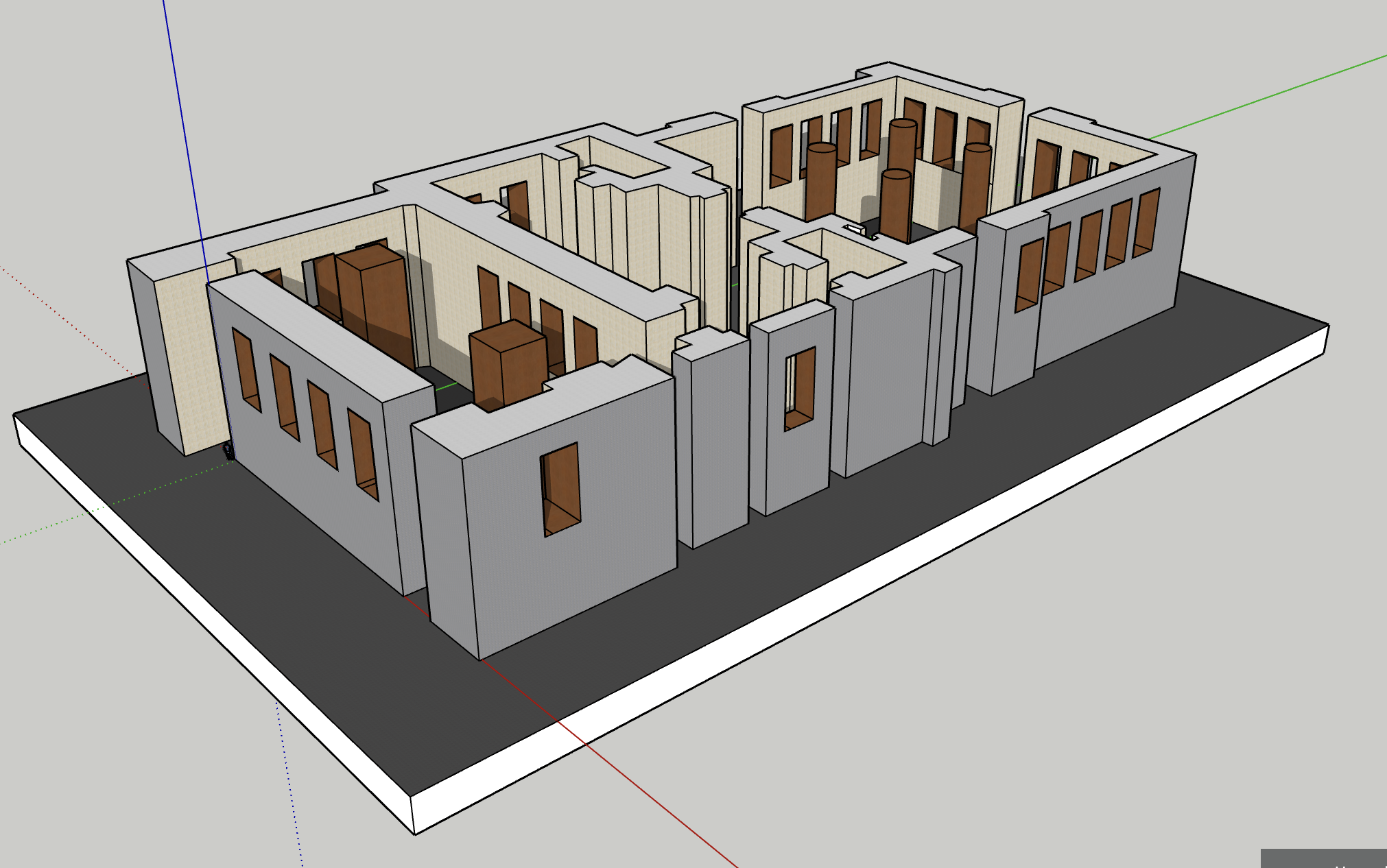
  3D model of Central Representative Unit, Halls A, B, and C
- The royal palace. Covering an area of 16,000 square metres (170,000 sq ft), it was the biggest palace in the Levant of its time. The palace's northeastern part consisted of two stories, as did the northwestern wing. In total, the first story contained at least eighty rooms. Compared to other palaces of the era in the region, such as the Royal Palace of Mari, Qatna's palace was gigantic, including massive halls such as hall C, formerly known as the temple of Belet-Ekallim (Ninegal), (Note: Robert du Mesnil du Buisson discovered the hall in the 1920s and thought it, along with the whole western part of the palace, was a temple that he called the temple of Nin-Egal, because it contained the inventories of the offerings presented to the goddess Nin-Egal. Modern research showed the supposed temple to be a hall of the royal palace and it was named room C.) which was 1,300 square metres (14,000 sq ft) in size, and hall A, which was 820 square metres (8,800 sq ft) in size. The palace was constructed during the Middle-to-Late Bronze Age transition period, around 1600 BC, (Note: The date of the palace's construction is debated; du Mesnil du Buisson dated it to the late third/early second millennium BC, while Ella Dardaillon, Peter Pfälzner and Mirko Novák believe it was built during the Middle Bronze I-Middle Bronze II ages transition period. Daniele Morandi Bonacossi prefers the 1600 BC date.) in the northern part of the acropolis above an abandoned necropolis.
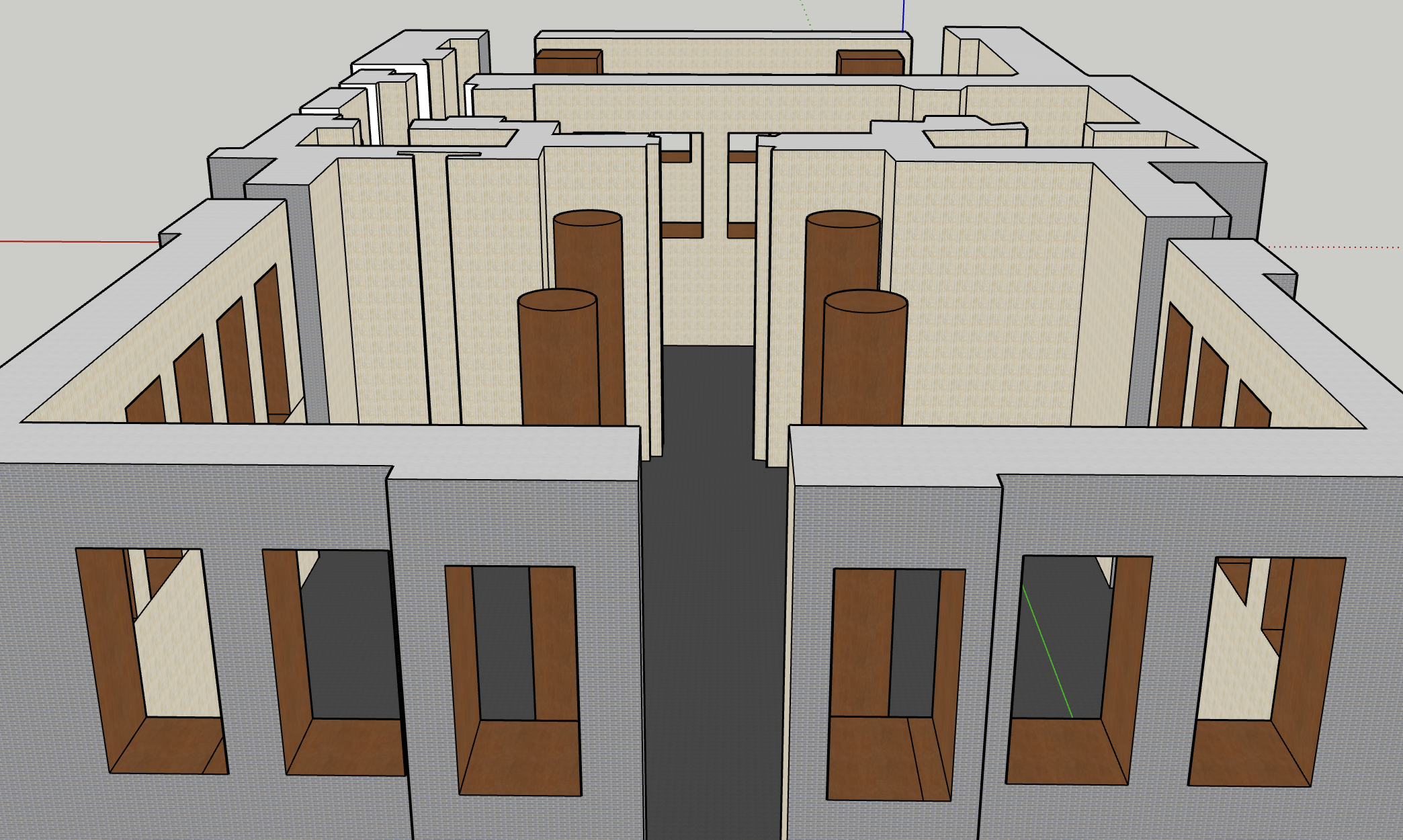
- Detail of Hall C
  The Central Representative Unit of the palace consisted of three primary halls, all roofed using imposing wooden beams, likely cedar. The audience, governmental, and cultic halls are known to be the heart of the palace's functional value. These units are built using the architectural Double-Hall Concept, seen as it consists of two rectangular halls A and B, followed by a significantly larger square Hall C; Used as a communal banquet and gathering hall, highlighting an immense ceiling of 39 x 39 meters, structurally reinforced with four wooden pillars placed 12 meters apart from each other. Hall B (46m x 14.6m) may be associated with the king's political/ governmental operations such as overseeing working efficiency, reviewing output of goods, and accounting of payments. Placed above the Palace's Royal Hypogeum, Hall A (41m x 20m) held strong religious connotation and was reserved for ritual practice. Altogether, the Central Representative Unit acts as the Royal Palace's functional identity, highlighting the roles that religious ritual, palatial politics, and commercial economy played into the identity of Qatna.
- The southern palace. Located immediately south of the royal palace, it had at least twenty rooms and concrete floors. The structure is heavily damaged, making the dating of its construction difficult.
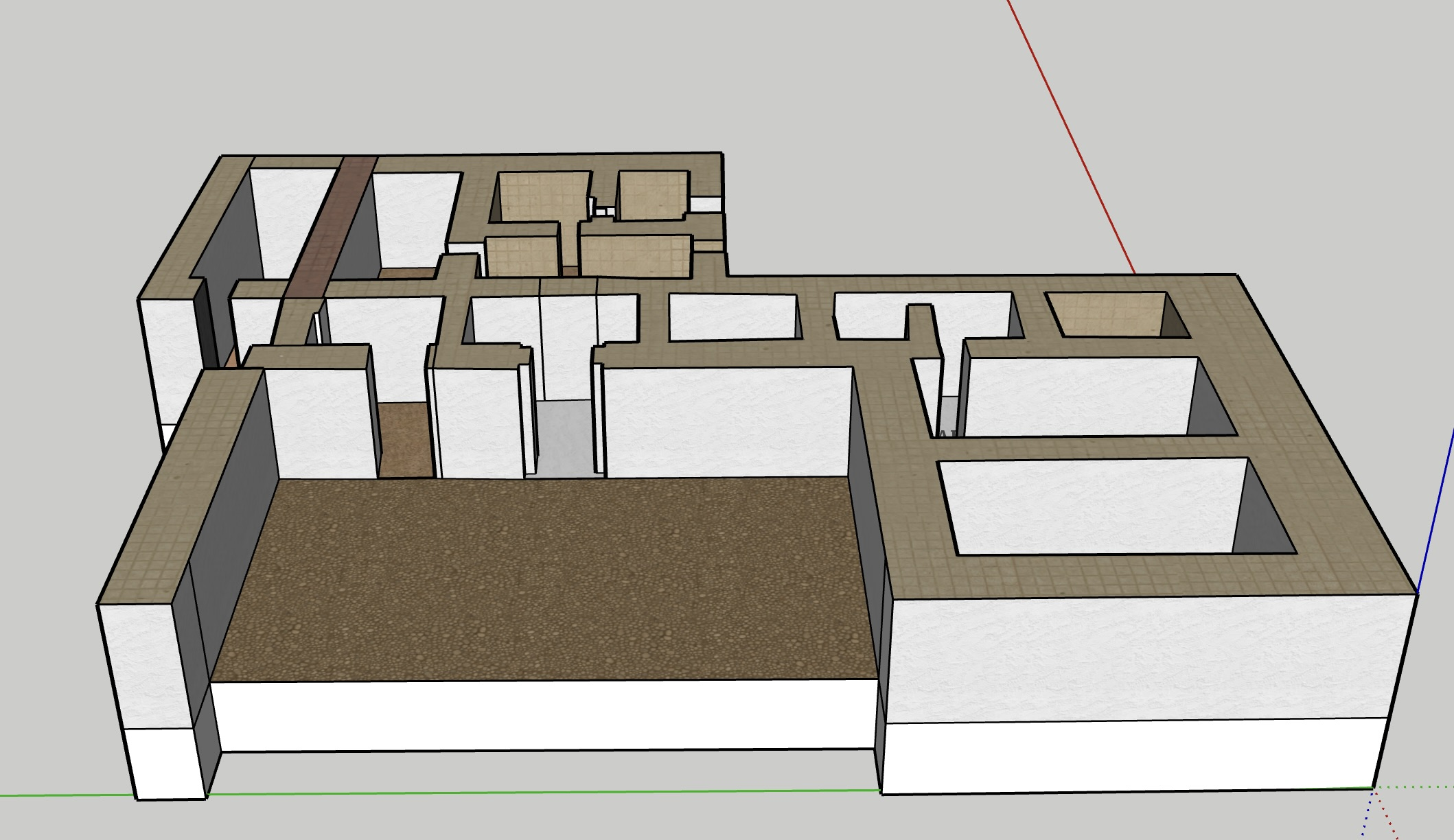
- A 3D reconstruction of the southern section of the Eastern Palace, showcasing an open pebbled courtyard and two entrances to the palace
  The Eastern Palace, situated east of the Royal Palace in the upper city at Qatna, was constructed during the Middle Bronze Age II by incorporating pre-existing Northern and Southern Buildings from the Middle Bronze Age I to II. The construction of the palace involved enlargement of previous buildings by addition of two new wings of rooms adjacent to the new Court I. A new Room E served a key role in the integration by compensating for the different elevation of the Northern and Southern Buildings with partial terracing and deeper foundational trenches. The completed palace consisted of twenty seven rooms and a possible western wing destroyed by a Late Bronze Age II pit immediately west of the large pebbled courtyard measured at 17 x 10 meters.
  - Excavations at the site were incomplete before cessation in 2011, notably in the south-eastern sector. The functions of various rooms are at present subject to preliminary conjectures based on existing archaeological findings. Aside from identification of Room A and Room C as entrances to the palace, archaeological findings suggest Room P as a metallurgical workshop based on evidence of continual floor repairs, traces of kilns, and unearthed metal fragments. In addition, the architectural layout of the Palace is reminiscent of Old Syrian palatial constructions with an elongated architectural plan and a peripheral open courtyard which allows access to different parts of the palace. The parallel with Old Syrian architectural tradition, found in Western Palace of Ebla and Yarim Lim's Palace at Alalakh, allowed for identification of the throne room and antechamber within the palace.
  - The palace was eventually abandoned in the Middle-to-Late Bronze Age transition period transition when the Royal Palace was constructed, owing to possible structural fragility and a need for reorganization of urban layout in the upper city.
- The lower city palace. Located in the northern part of the lower city, it was built in the 16th century BC. It contains at least sixty rooms.

==== Tombs ====
- Tomb IV. This was discovered in the 1920s by Robert du Mesnil du Buisson; he dated it to 2500–2400 BC, while Claude Frédéric-Armand Schaeffer assigned it to the period between 2200 and 1900 BC. The tomb is a multi-chambered shaft burial, the only one of this kind in the city.
- The Middle Bronze Age necropolis, located near the northern edge of the upper city and heavily damaged by the royal palace constructed above it. The necropolis contained three types of burials: simple graves bordered by bricks, cooking vessels, or shafts cut into the rocks. The most notable shafts are tombs I, II, III and V.
- The Royal Hypogeum (tomb VI). This is located 12 metres (39 ft) beneath the royal palace, at the northern edge. The tomb consists of four chambers cut in the bedrock beneath the palace's foundations, and a corridor, 40 metres (130 ft) long, that connects it to hall A of the royal palace. Four doors divide the corridor, which then takes a turn to the east and stops abruptly; an antechamber 5 metres (16 ft) beneath the floor of the corridor follows and a wooden stair is used to descend to it, after which a door leads to the burial chambers. The hypogeum was in use for around 350 years, and bodies of both genders and different ages were interred in it; a minimum of 19–24 individuals were found in the tomb.
- Tomb VII. This is located beneath the northwest wing of the royal palace. It consists of an antechamber, and a double chamber shaped like a kidney. The tomb contained at least 79 individuals, in a striking contrast with the much bigger tomb VI that contained far fewer remains. Peter Pfälzner suggested that tomb VII was a place for re-burial; the very long period of the Royal Hypogeum's usage, meant that it needed to be cleared sometimes to make room for new interments and the older remains were thus transferred to tomb VII.

Tomb VII (Context and Material Evidence)

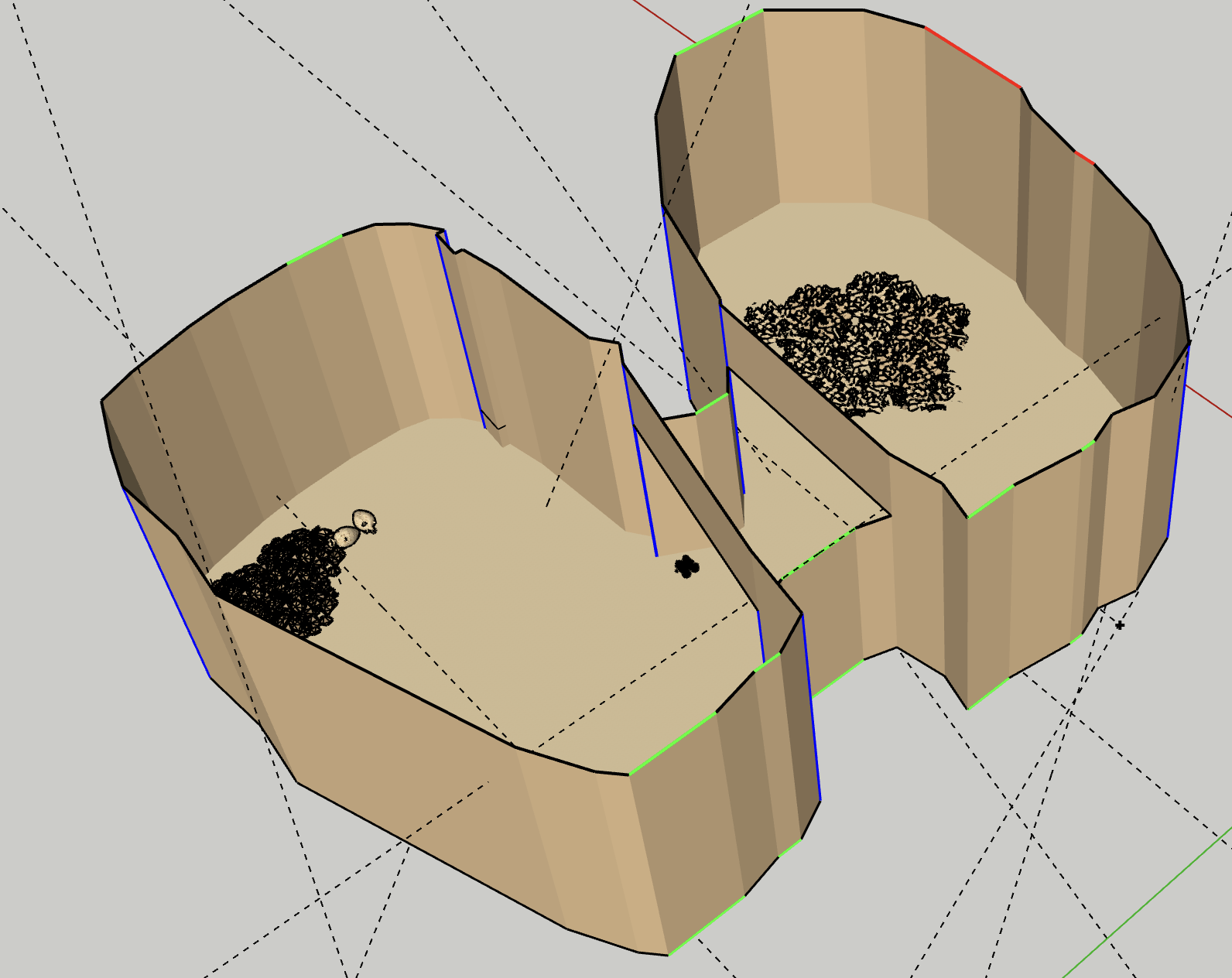
Top view of 3D model of Tomb VII at Qatna containing models of pottery and bones

- Tomb VII is one of the principal subterrean burial places discovered beneath the royal palace at Tell Mishrifeh/Qatna. Excavated by the German-Syrian team under the direction of Peter Pfälzner beginning in 2002, the tomb forms part of the larger Royal Hypogeum complex documented in the northwest wind of the palace. The structure is cut directly into the limestone bedrock and follows the characteristic Qatna tradition of irregular, rock-hewn chambers. The complex includes an entrance area and two interconnected chambers, whose curved outlines and uneven walls reflect the hand-excavated Bronze Age quarrying techniques identified throughout the palace's substructure.
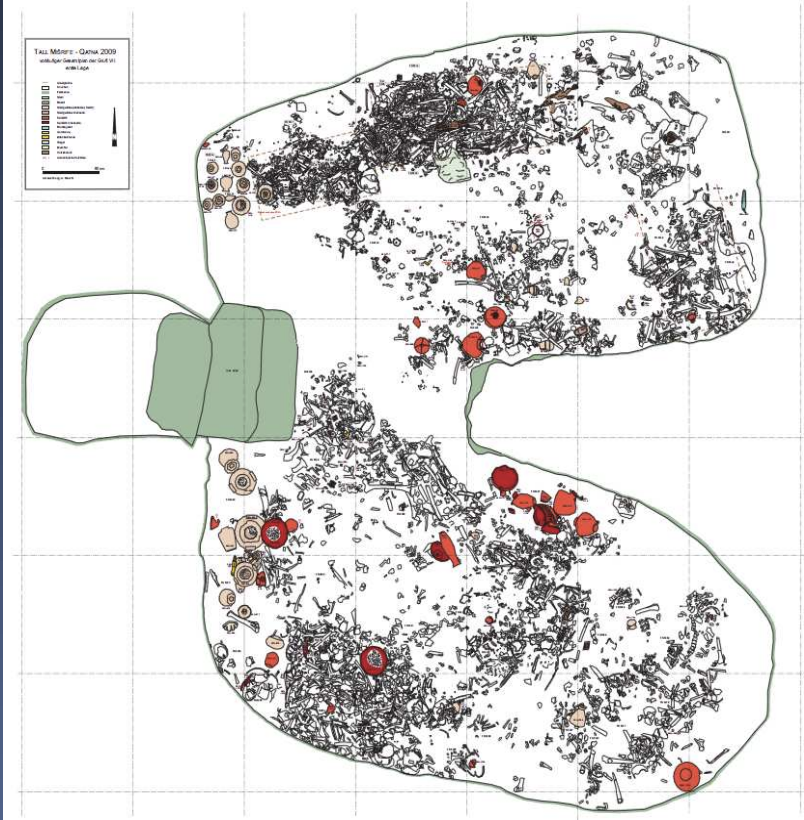
- Tomb VII plan of the uppermost layer - red: ceramics, rosé: stone vessels, green: solid rock, grey: human and animal bones
  Excavation reports describe the interior surfaces as roughly worked limestone showing fissures, chisel marks and deposits of sediment, which is consisten with long-term use and subsequent sealing. The tomb contained a dense accumulation of human bone, pottery and small finds, representing multiple depositional phases spanning the Middle to Late Bronze Age. Pfälzner's analysis of stratigraphy and deposition notes that the assemblage includes commingled skeletal material, ceramic fragments, and stone vessels, suggesting episodes of rearrangement and secondary deposition rather than single-event burials.
- The material culture recovered from Tomb VII reflects the broader burial practices of Qatna's elite population. Simple Ware bowls and jars, characteristic of local MB II-LB I ceramic production, were found in limited numbers, while fragments of stone vessels indicate the presence of higher-grave status grave goods. The quantity of human remains has provided important evidence for reconstructing long-term funerary behaviour at Qatna, including the management of ancestral dead and the maintenance of palace cult practices. Together, Tomb VII and the adjacent Royal Hypogeum offer one of the most detailed archaeological records for elite Bronze Age mortuary architecture in inland Syria.

==== Other landmarks ====
- The walls. A large rampart surrounded Qatna reaching 18 metres (59 ft) in height and 60 metres (200 ft) to 90 metres (300 ft) in width at the base. (Note: Investigations of Qatna's fortifications were not carried out, hindering the determination of the rampart's age; however, considering that similar large cities in the region, such as Ebla, had their fortifications built during the Middle Bronze Age I, a similar date is hypothesized for Qanta's rampart. However, they might have been built during the late Middle Bronze Age II based on radiocarbon dating of the western section of the rampart, the only section to have been dated this way.) The rampart contained many gates, (Note: The number of gates and their dates is debated; four main gates are visible, but further investigation is needed.) and, according to a tablet from Qatna, the name of one of them was "(city) gate of the palace"; the royal palace lies east of the gate in the western rampart and might have been the palace named in the tablet.
- Mishrifeh Lake. Qatna grew on the shore of a lake that dried completely toward the end of the Bronze Age, in c. 1200 BC. When the defenses were constructed, the northern and western parts of the rampart were built inside the lake, dividing it into an inner lake fed by a spring located in the northern foot of the upper city, while the larger part locked outside the walls constituted a reservoir for the inhabitants.

== History ==
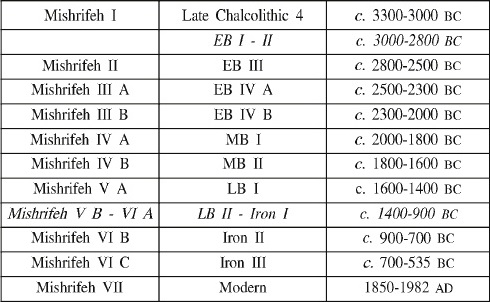
Qatna's archaeological phases

=== Chalcolithic ===
The site was first occupied during the Late Chalcolithic IV period (3300–3000 BC). This early settlement was concentrated on the central part of the upper town; its function is unknown and it ended in the late 4th millennium BC. (Note: Pisé installations and fireplaces were discovered.)

=== Early Bronze ===
==== Early Bronze III ====
After a hiatus of several centuries, the site was reoccupied around 2800 BC during the Early Bronze Age III.

==== Early Bronze IV ====
The last two centuries of the 3rd millennium BC saw widespread disruption of urban settlements in Syria and the abandonment of many cities; however, Qatna seems to be an exception, as it continued to grow. During the Early Bronze Age IV, Qatna was a circular city which reached a size of 25 ha (62 acres); it included a dense residential quarter and facilities for the storage and processing of grains, especially a large multi-roomed granary similar to the one in Tell Beydar. The city may have been one of the urban centers of the Ib'al federation, perhaps the center of a king or prince. The early city occupied the acropolis, and none of its remains were found in the lower city. Most of the small settlements surrounding Qatna, 1 ha (2.5 acres) to 2 ha (4.9 acres), appeared during this period; this might have been connected with the emergence of a central institution in the city.

=== Middle Bronze ===
==== Kingdom of Qatna ====
In the Middle Bronze, the Kingdom of Qatna was established around 2000 BC. At the beginning of the Middle Bronze Age I, the city expanded and covered an area of 110 ha (270 acres). This growth reduced the number of the small settlements as people were drawn into the expanded metropolis. It is probable that the earliest mention of "Qatna" by this name dates to the same period. According to Thomas Schneider, a city named Qedem, mentioned in a controversial passage in the Story of Sinuhe dating to the beginning of the Twelfth Dynasty of Egypt (early 20th century BC), is most probably to be identified with Qatna. (Note: The text was studied by many scholars who presented similar readings of a sentence mentioning a ruler of a city; the name of that city was read by different scholars as Kedme (Alan Gardiner), Kedemi (Adolf Erman), Qedem (Gustave Lefebvre) and Kedem (William Kelly Simpson).) Qedem in the Egyptian text is written "Qdm", and, in Egyptian, Qatna is written as "Qdn". If Schneider's interpretation is correct, then this is the first known written mention of the city. The text also mentions that the title of the ruler was Mekim (or Mekum), a royal title known from Ebla. (Note: The title in the Egyptian text is Meki, a variant of Mekim. Although ancient Mesopotamians treated the term Mekim as a proper name, and various modern scholars share this view, most researchers agree that Mekim is a title derived from the Semitic root Malākum (meaning "Ruling").) The theory of Schneider is debated: in Sinuhe's story, the protagonist turned back to Qedem after reaching Byblos; Joachim Friedrich Quack pointed out that the Egyptian verb "ḥs ̯i" used in the text was known to indicate that a certain expedition had reached its final destination and was now returning to Egypt, indicating that Qedem was south of Byblos, while Qatna is to the north of Byblos.

==== Zenith ====
The next mention of Qatna after the Story of Sinuhe comes from Mari in the 18th century BC, during the reign of Išḫi-Addu of Qatna. However, a tablet found in Tuttul, dating to the early reign of the Mariote king Yahdun-Lim in the late 19th century BC, mentions a king named Amut-pi'el I, who is most probably the father of Išḫi-Addu; this would make him the first known king of Qatna. Also during the reign of Yahdun-Lim, the kingdom of Yamhad in Aleppo and its king Sumu-Epuh enter the historical record through the texts of Mari.

Early in their history, Qatna and Yamhad had hostile relations; Amut-pi'el I, in alliance with Yahdun-Lim and Ḫammu-Nabiḫ (probably king of Tuttul), attacked the Yamhadite city of Tuba, which was a personal possession of Aleppo's royal family, and took a large booty. Later, Yahdun-Lim embarked on an expedition to the Mediterranean Sea that was used for ideological purposes, as it was meant to echo Gilgamesh's deeds; the journey likely had undeclared political motives as well, when seen in the context of the alliance with Qatna. The Mariote–Qaṭanean alliance, which was probably cemented by dynastic marriage, (Note: Gabetum, a consort of Yahdun-Lim, was perhaps a princess from Qatna.) must have provoked Yamhad, which supported rebellions in Mari to preoccupy Yahdun-Lim with his own problems. Despite the tension and battles, a full-scale war with Yamhad was avoided.

Qatna was at its apex during the reign of Išḫi-Addu. Mari was conquered by Shamshi-Adad of the Kingdom of Upper Mesopotamia, who appointed his son Yasmah-Adad as its king. Išḫi-Addu was allied with Shamshi-Adad and is attested corresponding with Mari for a period of six years between c. 1783 and 1778 BC. At its height, the kingdom extended from the upper valley of the Orontes to Qadeš in the west, while Palmyra was Qatna's easternmost city. It was bordered by Yamhad in the north, while the south was dominated by Hazor, a Qaṭanean vassal. The many kingdoms of Amurru, which controlled the central Levantine coast between Byblos and Ugarit, bordered Qatna from the west and were counted among Išhi-Addu's vassals. Also under the rule of Qatna were various cities in the Beqaa Valley and the cities in the region of Apum, in the modern Damascus Oasis.

The kingdom was sometimes threatened by nomads; a letter sent to Yasmah-Adad informs him that 2000 Suteans conducted a raid against Qatna. Relations with Yamhad worsened during Išḫi-Addu's reign and the conflict evolved into border warfare; Qatna occupied the city of Parga in the region of Hamath for a while before Sumu-Epuh retook it. In the south, Išḫi-Addu faced a general rebellion; the alliance with Shamshi-Adad was cemented by the marriage of Išḫi-Addu's daughter to Yasmah-Adad in c. 1782 BC. The following year, after petitions by Qatna, Shamshi-Adad sent an army to help Išḫi-Addu deal with the rebellion. (Note: Shamshi-Adad planned to send an army of 20,000 soldiers, and for his son Yasmah-Adad to lead them, but these plans could not be realized. Instead, a much more modest army was sent under command of generals who were placed in the service of Išḫi-Addu for four years (c. 1781–1778 BC).) The Kingdom of Upper Mesopotamia troops avoided engaging Yamhad and did not participate in its war with Qatna, while Išḫi-Addu took up residence in Qadeš to oversee the suppression of the rebellion, which apparently was supported by Yamhad. After four years in the service of Qatna, Shamshi-Adad ordered his troops to return; this might have been connected to a peace treaty between Shamshi-Adad and Yarim-Lim I, son of Sumu-Epuh. Išḫi-Addu, who in the past had declared that "even if Shamshi-Adad would conclude peace with Sumu-epuh, I will never make peace with Sumu-epuh, as long as I live!", was delivered a heavy blow, but Mari's sources are silent on how the king dealt with the situation, and by the time they resumed mentioning Qatna in c. 1772 BC, Išḫi-Addu was dead and succeeded by his son Amut-piʾel II.

==== Decline ====
The political and military balance in the region changed dramatically during the reign of Amut-piʾel II; Shamshi-Adad I had died by about 1775 BC, and his empire disintegrated, while Yasmah-Adad was removed from his throne and replaced with Zimri-Lim. Yarim-Lim I gained the upper hand and turned his kingdom into the supreme power in the Levant; Qatna was forced to respect the borders and interests of Yamhad. In Mari, Zimri-Lim, who was Yarim-Lim's protégé, married Amut-piʾel II's sister and Yasmah-Adad's widow Dam-Ḫuraṣi, and this seemed to satisfy the king of Qatna, as his relations with Mari were never hostile. (Note: Although the identification of Dam-Ḫuraṣi, wife of Zimri-Lim, with the widow of Yasmah-Adad has an academic consensus, some scholars, such as Jack M. Sasson, argue against it.) In 1772 BC, the Yaminite tribes revolted against Zimri-Lim, who asked Qatna for help; Amut-piʾel II sent his troops to Dūr-Yahdun-Lim (probably modern Deir ez-Zor) to support Mari, but when he asked for Mariote military support at a later time, Zimri-Lim hesitated as Yarim-Lim I was expressly against such a dispatch. When Qatna tried to establish an alliance with Eshnunna, Mari, which was at war with Eshnunna, arrested the messengers on the pretext that Zimri-Lim feared for their safety; in reality, the king of Mari was probably acting on behalf of Yamhad to prevent Qatna from establishing such an alliance.

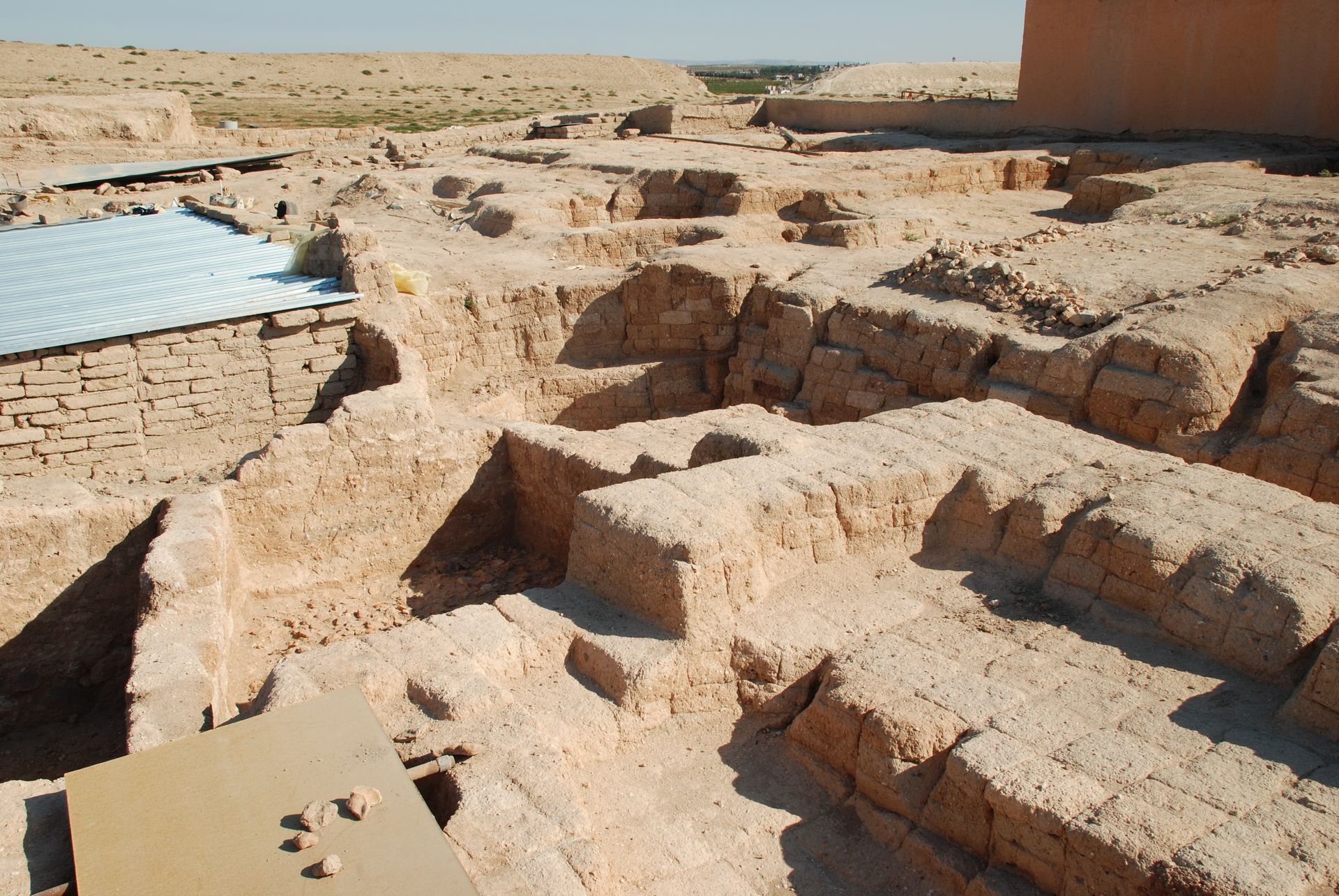
The royal palace

The archive of Mari reports a plan between Zimri-Lim, the king of Carchemish and the king of Eshnunna (who made peace with Mari), to attack Qatna. Such an alliance could not have been realized without the participation of Yamhad, overlord of both Mari and Carchemish; in the end, the plan was not pursued and the tense relations between Qatna and Yamhad eased toward the last years of Yarim-Lim's reign. In a letter written to Zimri-Lim, Yarim-Lim I agreed to establish peace with Qatna if Amut-piʾel II were to come by himself to Aleppo, thus acknowledging the supremacy of Yamhad; no proof can be shown for a meeting taking place between the two kings. (Note: Yarim-Lim wrote: "we will establish good relations between me and him, an oath by the gods and a firm treaty.") Just before his death in 1765 BC, Yarim-Lim called a meeting of his vassals, and Zimri-Lim traveled to Aleppo where he met messengers from Qatna and Hazor, indicating that Amut-piʾel II started recognizing the supremacy of Yarim-Lim, and that Hazor, Qatna's vassal, was now obeying Yamhad. Yarim-Lim's successor Hammurabi I arranged a peace with Qatna that probably did not require the Qaṭanean king to visit Aleppo personally, but indicated Qatna's acceptance of Yamhad's superiority. This apparent yielding seems a mere formality as Qatna continued its aspirations for power, as became clear in its behavior during the Elamite invasion of Mesopotamia in year ten of Zimri-Lim's reign. An Elamite messenger reached Emar and sent three of his servants to Qatna; Hammurabi I of Yamhad learned of this and sent troops to intercept them on their return. The servants were captured and questioned, revealing that Amut-piʾel II told them to tell their monarch that "The country is delivered to you, come up to me! if you come up, you will not be taken by surprise." The Qaṭanean king also sent two messengers to Elam, but they were probably captured in Babylon.

The hegemony of Yamhad affected Qatna's economy; the trade route connecting Mesopotamia and Mari to Qatna through Palmyra lost its importance, while the trade routes from the Mediterranean to Mesopotamia came under the full control of Aleppo, contributing to Qatna's loss of wealth. Following the destruction of Mari by Hammurabi of Babylon around 1761 BC, information about Qatna becomes scarce; in the late 17th century BC, Yamhad invaded and defeated Qatna during the reign of Yarim-Lim III. The political and commercial importance of Qatna declined quickly during the Late Bronze Age (LB I), around 1600 BC, as a result of growing Egyptian and Mitannian influences. Numerous small states appeared in the region and detached from Qatna.

=== Late Bronze ===
==== Mitanni period ====
It is not known when Qatna lost its independence. It became a Mitannian vassal in the 16th century BC, but the archive of Qatna proves that even in its final period during the 14th century BC, Qatna maintained a certain degree of autonomy. Early Egyptian military intrusions to the region occurred under Thutmose I (r. 1506–1493 BC– ). The name Qedem appears in an inscription found on a fragmented gateway from Karnak dated to the reign of Thutmose mentioning a military campaign in the northern Levant. The inscription suggests that the mentioned cities submitted to the king. The geographic sequence given in the inscription is Qedem ("Qdm"), Tunip ("Twnjp") and "Ḏj3 wny" (maybe Siyannu); Qatna (Qdn in Egyptian) would fit better in the geographic sequence and Alexander Ahrens suggested that the inscription might have meant Qatna. Any oaths of loyalty to Egypt taken by Levantine rulers were forgotten after Thutmose I's death. The Egyptians returned under the leadership of Thutmose III, who reached Qatna during his eighth Asiatic campaign, around 1446 BC. Thutmose III did not rule directly in Qatna but established vassalage ties and attended an archery contest with the Qaṭanean king.

Towards the end of Thutmose III's reign and under the influence of Mitanni, the Syrian states changed their loyalty, causing Thutmose's successor Amenhotep II to march north in his seventh year on the throne, where he fought troops from Qatna near the city. (Note: Amenhotep did not state that Qatna was in a revolt; he only spoke of "a few Asiatics from the town of Qatna who came to cause troubles".) The threat of the Hittites prompted Mitanni's king to sue for peace: Artatama I approached Amenhotep II for an alliance and long negotiations started. The talks lasted until after Amenhotep's death, when his successor Thutmose IV (r. 1401/1397–1391/1388 BC– ) finally sealed a treaty that divided the Levant between the two powers. Qatna and the states north of it, such as Nuhašše, fell into the sphere of Mitanni. Despite its reduced status, Qatna still controlled the Lebanon Mountains 80 km (50 mi) away in the 14th century BC.

===== Possible incorporation into Nuhašše =====
During the reign of Adad-Nirari of Nuhašše in the 14th century BC, Qatna may have become part of his kingdom. In 1977, Astour considered Qatna a constituent part of the lands of Nuhasse, and identified a king of Qatna named Adad-Nirari with the Nuhaššite king. Astour was followed by Thomas Richter in 2002, who considered Qatna to be a secondary city in the domain of the Nuhaššite king. The tablets of Qatna mention a Shakkanakku (military governor) named Lullu, and Richter considered him an official of Nuhašše. The hypothesis of Richter is debated; a number of scholars accept it, for example Pfälzner, who suggested that the Nuhaššite king may have resided in Qatna's royal palace. Richter dated the rule of the Nuhassite king to the period preceding the Hittite king Šuppiluliuma I's first Syrian war, during which Adad-Nirari of Nuhašše opposed the Hittites, was defeated, and, according to Richter, had his kingdom split between different Hittite puppets including Idanda of Qatna.

Gernot Wilhelm saw no ground for Richter's assumption concerning the identification of the Nuhaššite monarch with the Qaṭanean king. This identification rests on the theory that Qatna belonged geographically to the region of Nuhašše, (Note: Richter considered the "Nuhašše lands" to include Nuhašše, Qatna and Ugulzat.) but no solid evidence supports this assumption, and the Shattiwaza treaty between the Hittites and Mitannians clearly mentioned Qatna as a different realm from Nuhašše during the first Syrian war when the Nuhaššite king ruled. If Qatna was part of the Nuhaššite kingdom, its submission to the Hittites would not have been mentioned separately in the treaty. It is a fact that Qatna was ruled by Idanda during the first war and the Hittite documents do not mention a change of rulers in Qatna made by Šuppiluliuma, leaving no reason to suspect that Idanda ascended the throne as a result of the war. Jacques Freu likewise rejected Richter's hypothesis. Citing different arguments, he concluded that Adad-Nirari of Nuhašše was a contemporary of Idanda, the successor of the Qaṭanean Adad-Nirari.

===== The campaigns of Šuppiluliuma I =====
Early in his reign, the Hittite king Šuppiluliuma I (r. c. 1350–1319 BC– ) aimed at conquering Mitanni's lands west of the Euphrates. Šuppiluliuma waged several campaigns to achieve his goal: the first Syrian foray, the second Syrian foray, the first Syrian war and the second Syrian war. (Note: The campaigns of Šuppiluliuma I in Syria are debated, and divided into four main phases by scholars: First Syrian foray: the term was coined by Kenneth Kitchen; it probably took place in southeastern Anatolia on the borders between Mitanni and the Hittites ending with a Mitannian victory. Michael Astour dates the event to the period between years 30 and 34 of the Egyptian pharaoh Amenhotep III's reign (1391–1353 or 1388–1351 BC); this offensive might have been led by Šuppiluliuma's father, Tudhaliya II.; Second Syrian foray: also first suggested by Kitchen, this was supposedly aimed at western Syria but its occurrence is highly debated. Šuppiluliuma I, in his treaty with the Mitannian king Shattiwaza, mentions that he plundered the lands west of the Euphrates (i.e., western Syria) long before his "one year campaign" (which happened after the second Syrian foray), and reached Mount Niblani (Lebanon). Astour dates the second foray to the eleventh regnal year of the Egyptian pharaoh Akhenaten (1353–1336 or 1351–1334 BC).; The first Syrian war or one-year campaign, was a direct confrontation between Mitanni and Šuppiluliuma and is given different dates by various scholars; William J. Murnane places it at any point between Akhenaten's 9th and 14th year. A more suitable date would be the beginning of Akhenaten's 12th year on the throne. The account of the first war is handed down in the historical prologue of the Shattiwaza treaty.; The second Syrian war, also known as the six-year campaign or the Hurrian war, was a conflict that brought Syria firmly under the rule of Šuppiluliuma I; it started at least ten years following Akhenaten's death.) The events and chronology of the Hittites' subjugation of Qatna are debated. King Idanda was a Hittite vassal; a letter sent by the Hittite general Ḫanutti contains a demand that Idanda fortify the city. Freu believed that Idanda abandoned Mitanni and joined the Hittites as a result of Šuppiluliuma's first Syrian foray. The Mitannian king Tushratta retaliated by invading Qatna, and burning the royal palace; an event dated to around 1340 BC. (Note: Pfälzner attributed the destruction of the palace to Šuppiluliuma I, while Richter believed that it was a Syrian state that opposed the Hittites, such as Amurru.) Wilhelm, on the other hand, believed that Idanda submitted to the Hittites as a result of the first Syrian war.

====== Collapse ======
The events leading to the destruction of the royal palace did not cause the destruction of the whole city. The Shattiwaza treaty, which describes the events of the first Syrian war, mentions that Qatna was invaded and destroyed, and its people were deported during the war. However, Idanda's successor, Akizzi, was ruling in the second half of the Egyptian pharaoh Akhenaten's reign following the first Syrian war, or shortly before the second Syrian war. (Note: Freu insisted that Qatna was destroyed during the first Syrian war, citing the fact that the letters sent by Akizzi to Egypt asking for help date to the Amarna Period, while the second Syrian war took place long after the abandonment of Amarna.) This discrepancy can be explained if the treaty did not mention the events in a chronological order; many scholars, such as Wilhelm, believe that the author of the document organized the text according to the principle of association, rather than following the sequence of events.

But now the king of Ḫatti has sent them [i.e., the temples] up in flames.
The king of Ḫatti has taken the gods and the fighting men of Qatna

— Translation of letter EA 55 written by king Akizzi of Qatna
describing the destruction of his kingdom.

Akizzi contacted Egypt and declared himself a servant to the pharaoh. An anti-Hittite coalition, probably organized by Akizzi, was established. Šuppiluliuma tried diplomatic means to solve the conflict but Akizzi rejected them. Hittite military intervention soon followed and Akizzi asked Egypt for troops, but received none. Šuppiluliuma himself came to Qatna, aided by Aziru of Amurru. The Hittite monarch took with him a statue of the sun deity, which had been given to Qatna by an ancestor of Akhenaten. This move symbolized the final capitulation of the kingdom.

Akizzi survived the destruction of his city and continued his communication with the pharaoh for some time; in an Amarna letter (EA 55), the king of Qatna described to Akhenaten the actions of Šuppiluliuma and his plundering of Qatna. Hence, the final sack of Qatna occurred after the royal palace was destroyed in 1340 BC, and before the death of Akhenaten, to whom the letter was addressed, in c. 1334 BC. Trevor Bryce suggested that Akizzi might have accepted Hittite overlordship again. In any case, he was the last known king. The city lost its importance following its sacking and never regained its former status.

==== Post-Hittite destruction ====
The destruction of the royal palace constituted a break in Qatna's history; all other palaces were abandoned and the political system collapsed. A pottery workshop was built in the place of the southern palace, while the lower city palace was replaced by two adjacent courtyards surrounded by walls. Archaeological data suggest a much reduced settlement with no regional role. Following the 13th century BC, no archaeological evidence exists to prove the city was occupied; the toponym Qatna stopped appearing and the next occupation level dates to the late 10th century BC, suggesting it was uninhabited for three centuries. (Note: An early 12th century BC document from Emar mention the destruction of a land named ^{KUR}qa-ad/t/ṭ-na by a governor of Sukhi; Murray R. Adamthwaite identified the land with Qatna but another city known as Qattunam (or Qattun, Qatni) located in the Lower Khabur can also be a candidate.)

=== Iron Age ===
==== Syro-Hittite and following periods ====
In the late 10th century and early 9th century BC, the site was reoccupied but its name during that time is unknown; (Note: In the 8th century BC, the toponym qt^{[}n^{]} was mentioned in Hama but the possibility that it refers to Qatna was denied by Edward Lipiński who noted that qt^{[}n^{]} was associated with the toponym Rg corresponding to the al-Rouge plain; therefore, Lipiński identify qt^{[}n^{]} as the ancient name of Qastun.) three human head sculptures made of basalt were discovered in the site; they probably date to the mid-9th century BC. At this time, the region was probably under the control of Palistin, with Qatna under the rule of Hamath, which was probably part of Palistin. The basalt heads bear similarities to a statue discovered in Palistin's capital, but there is not enough information to allow a general conclusion over the borders of Palistin and its extent into Qatna. The settlement was a small one; it included large buildings that were used both as residences and manufacturing facilities.

By the 8th century, the site saw a revival in settlement; the city expanded and many houses, public buildings, and storage areas were built. The newly expanded settlement was a contrast to the earlier 10th/9th century one; the existence of official buildings and the emergence of many satellite settlements surrounding Qatna suggest that the city was a local center in the kingdom of Hamath. The official buildings were violently destroyed, probably at the hands of the Assyrian king Sargon II (r. 722–705 BC– ), who annexed the region in 720 BC. The site continued to be inhabited during the Iron Age III, following the Assyrian destruction, but the settlement shrank considerably, being reduced to a village comprising the central part of the acropolis. It was abandoned in the mid-6th century BC.

In the mid-19th century, a modern village (al-Mishrifeh) was built within the ancient site. Houses were built on top of the royal palace floors, damaging them to a certain degree, but also protecting the underlying ruins. In 1982, the Syrian Directorate-General of Antiquities and Museums resettled the inhabitants in a new village next to the ancient tell, thus making the site available for modern archaeological research.

== Society ==
=== Population and language ===
The kingdom of Qatna had a predominantly Semitic Amorite population; all the personal names from Qatna in the Mari archive were Amorite. The royal family was also Amorite and it stayed as such during the Mitannian era, which witnessed the expansion of Hurrians; by the fifteenth century BC, Qatna had a sizable Hurrian element. The Arameans were responsible for the re-occupation of the site in the 1st millennium BC.

The Amorites in Qatna spoke their own language, but kings communicated with their counterparts using Akkadian, which was the language of writing in the city. Qatna's Akkadian became heavily influenced by Hurrian in the 15th and 14th centuries BC; Richter argued that a special Akkadian–Hurrian hybrid dialect developed in Qatna. Texts from Qatna exhibit many Hurrian elements, proving that Hurrian was prominent among scribes, but its predominance as a spoken language by the general public cannot be determined.

=== Religion ===
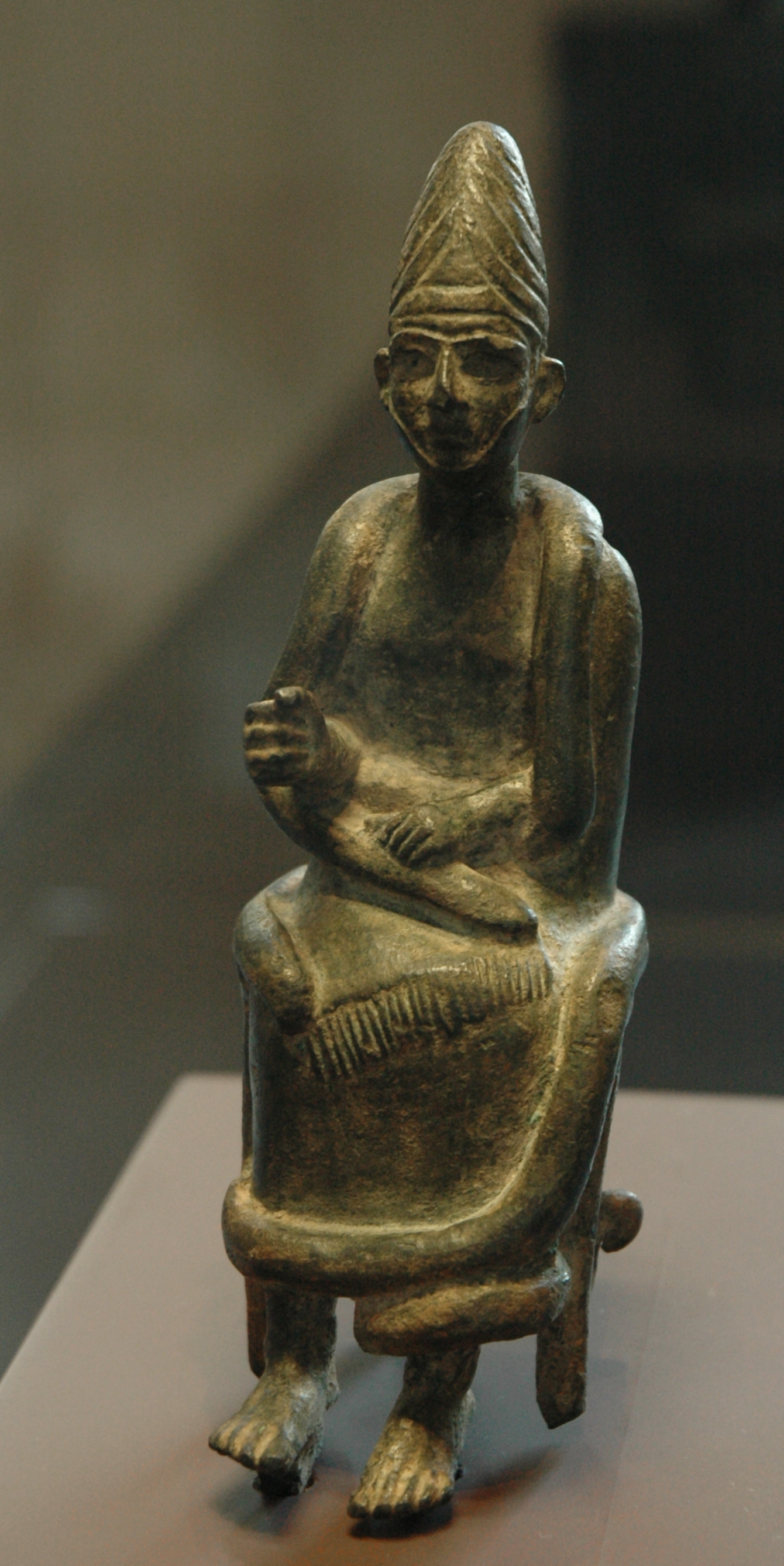
Statuette of a seated god from Qatna

Details about the religious life in Qatna are not available due to the rarity of written evidence from the city; in general, many cults seems to have existed and mixed in Qatna, most prominently the royal ancestor cult, the cult of gods and the cult of the dead.

==== Cult of gods ====
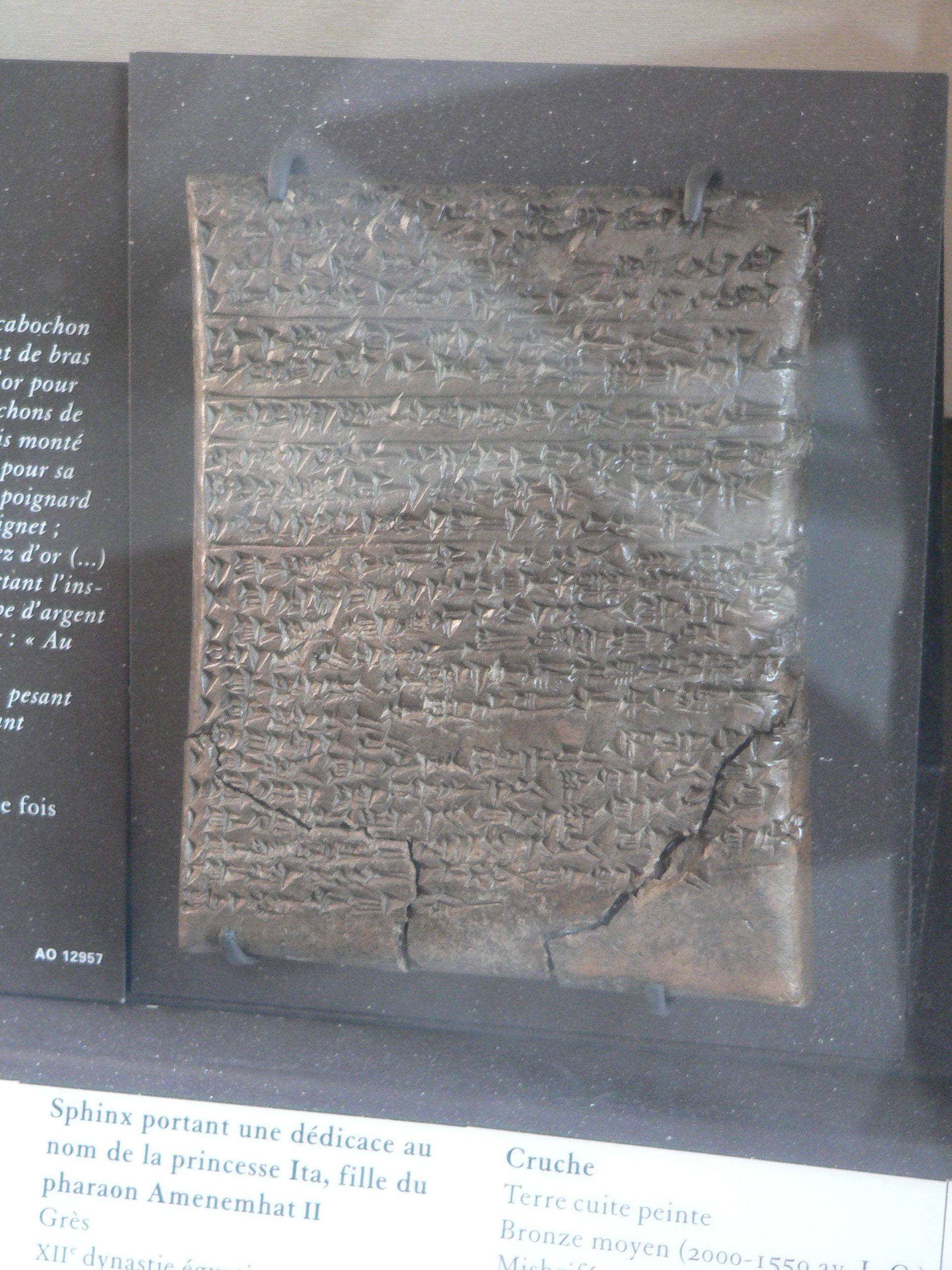
An inventory listing gifts offered to the "gods of the king"

Belet-Ekallim (Ninegal) was a prominent deity in Qatna; the inventories of gifts presented to the gods found in hall C of the palace show that she was a prominent element in the royal liturgy, where she was called the "lady of the palace" and "Belet Qatna", making her effectively the goddess of the city. However, no trace of a temple or shrine has been found in the building. (Note: After it became evident that hall C is not a temple of Belet-Ekallim, Pfälzner suggested that only a small chamber (code named room P), located in the north-eastern corner of hall C (called the "Saint des Saintes" by du Mesnil du Buisson), and the area GO in front of it (called the "Sanctuaire" by du Mesnil du Buisson), can be considered as the sanctuary of Belet-Ekallim. Dominique Charpin argued that no evidence for a Belet-Ekallim sanctuary exists in the palace; he believes that the temple should be looked for in Qatna, but outside the palace. One of Charpin's arguments is that four inventories were found in the palace but only inventory I mentions Belet-Ekallim while the others speak about the "gods of the king" and no temple is mentioned.) The inventories also mention the "gods of the king"; it is debated whether this referred to deities or to royal ancestors. Jean Bottéro identified the "gods of the king" with the sun god Šamaš, whom Akizzi called the "god of my father" in his letter to Akhenaten. (Note: More precisely, Akizzi mentioned "Šimigi" the Hurrian equivalent of Šamaš.) Gregorio del Olmo Lete considered Šamaš the god of Qatna's dynasty, but the "gods of the king" probably included other deities as well. Jean-Marie Durand considers Addu to be the god of the city based on a seal dating to Išḫi-Addu's reign describing Addu as such. Another indication of the deities worshiped in Qatna comes from the archive of Mari; the daughter of Išḫi-Add was devoted to the goddess Ishtar and Zimri-Lim once invited Amut-piʾel II to Mari to take part in rituals for that goddess, indicating that the cult of Ishtar was prominent in Qatna.

==== Cult of the Betyles ====
The texts of Mari show that the cult of stones, especially the "sikkanum" (i.e., Betyles—sacred stones), was widespread in western Syria, and its practice in Qatna is plausible. Du Mesnil du Buisson named room F in the royal palace "Haut-Lieu" and considered it a shrine of Ašera. Research done after 1999 ruled out du Mesnil du Buisson's hypothesis and concluded that the room is a bathroom, but further research showed that the bathroom interpretation must also be wrong. Pfälzner, based on its architecture being suitable for containing sacred stones, (Note: The lime floor of room F had a gap that could have supported a wooden threshold that separated a rectangular area from the rest of the room. This area was 5.5 by 3 metres (18.0 by 9.8 ft) in size and its northern half two rows of brick installations; each row consists of two further rows: a northern three low pillars and a southern three flat podiums opposite each others. There is a gap in the floor between each pillar and podium that could have been fitted with a slab of stone; the pillar would have supported the stone from behind while the podium would have worked as pedestal. However, the Betyles are missing, and there is evidence that they were robbed as the lime plaster of the floor is broken and pushed around the pillars.) suggested that room F was the palace shrine for the cult of Betyles. Pfälzner concludes that "an ultimate proof, however, for the function of Room F at Qaṭna cannot be deduced from this parallel. Nor is there a clue as to the dedication of the possible Betyle-sanctuary at Qaṭna".

==== Royal Ancestors cult ====
Ancestors were worshiped in Qatna; the royal hypogeum provided a large amount of data concerning the cult of ancestor worshiping and the practices associated with it. Two kinds of burials are distinguished; a primary burial intended to transport the dead into the netherworld, and a secondary burial that was intended to transform the deceased into their ultimate form: an ancestor. The royal hypogeum provides hints at the different rituals taking place during a secondary burial; a noticeable character is that skeletons were not complete, and no skulls are found for the majority of secondary burial remains. There is no evidence that skulls decayed as they would have left behind teeth, of which very few were found, indicating that the skulls were removed to be venerated in another location.

Bones in the secondary burial were arranged without respect for anatomical order; it is plausible to assume that the distribution process was the result of symbolic rituals that indicated the changing of the deceased's role by incorporating him or her into the group of royal ancestors. Pottery vessels were deposited next to the secondary burial remains; they were fixed on top of food offerings meant as a food supply for the dead, giving evidence for the performance of Kispu (nourishing and caring for one's ancestor through a regular supply of food and drink). Hundreds of pilled vessels provide evidence that the living participated and dined with their ancestors, venerating them. Pfälzner argues for a third burial process which he calls the tertiary burial; the eastern chamber of the hypogeum was used as an ossuary where human remains and animal bones left from the Kispu were mixed and pilled. Pfälzner conclude that bones left in that chamber were deposited there because they had become useless in funerary rituals, thus the chamber was their final resting place. Bones in the eastern chamber were stored with no respect for the unity of an individual, indicating that the persons buried were now part of the collective group of ancestors; this did not mean that the individuals were no longer cared for, as the many bowls in the chamber indicate the continuation of food offerings to those ancestors.

According to Pfälzner, a final burial stage can be noticed, which he calls the quaternary burial. Tomb VII, which most probably contained remains taken out of the royal hypogeum, seems to have worked as a storage for the remains of individuals whose Kispu cycle came to an end; very few bowls were found in that tomb. The Kispu was important for demonstrating the legitimacy of the king, thus it needed to be public and visible to a large crowd; Pfälzner suggests that hall A in the royal palace was the place for the public Kispu and that the antechamber of the royal hypogeum was dedicated for private Kispu that included only the king and the spirits of his ancestors.

=== Cultural memory ===
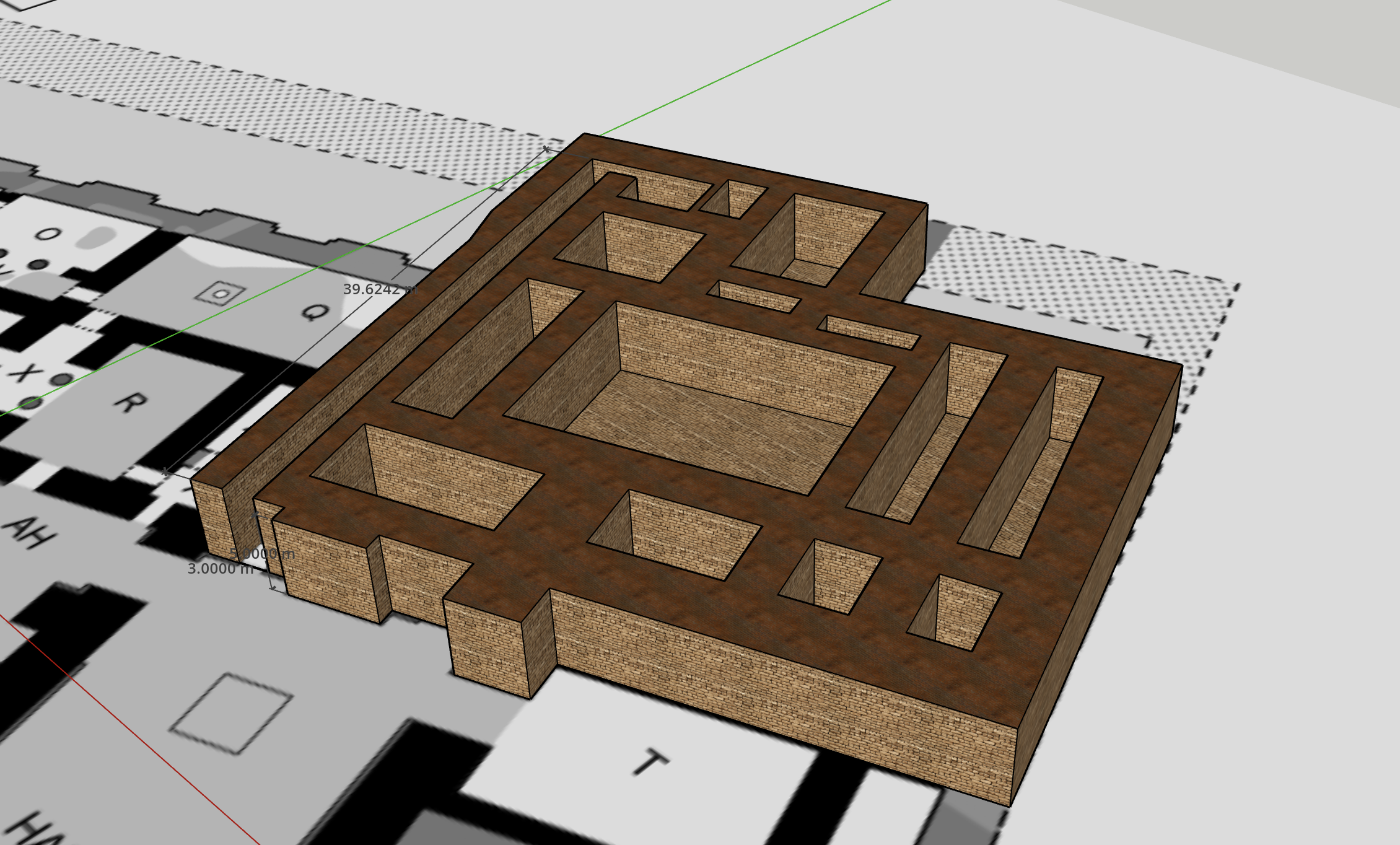
3D model of the Northeast section of Qatna's Royal Palace

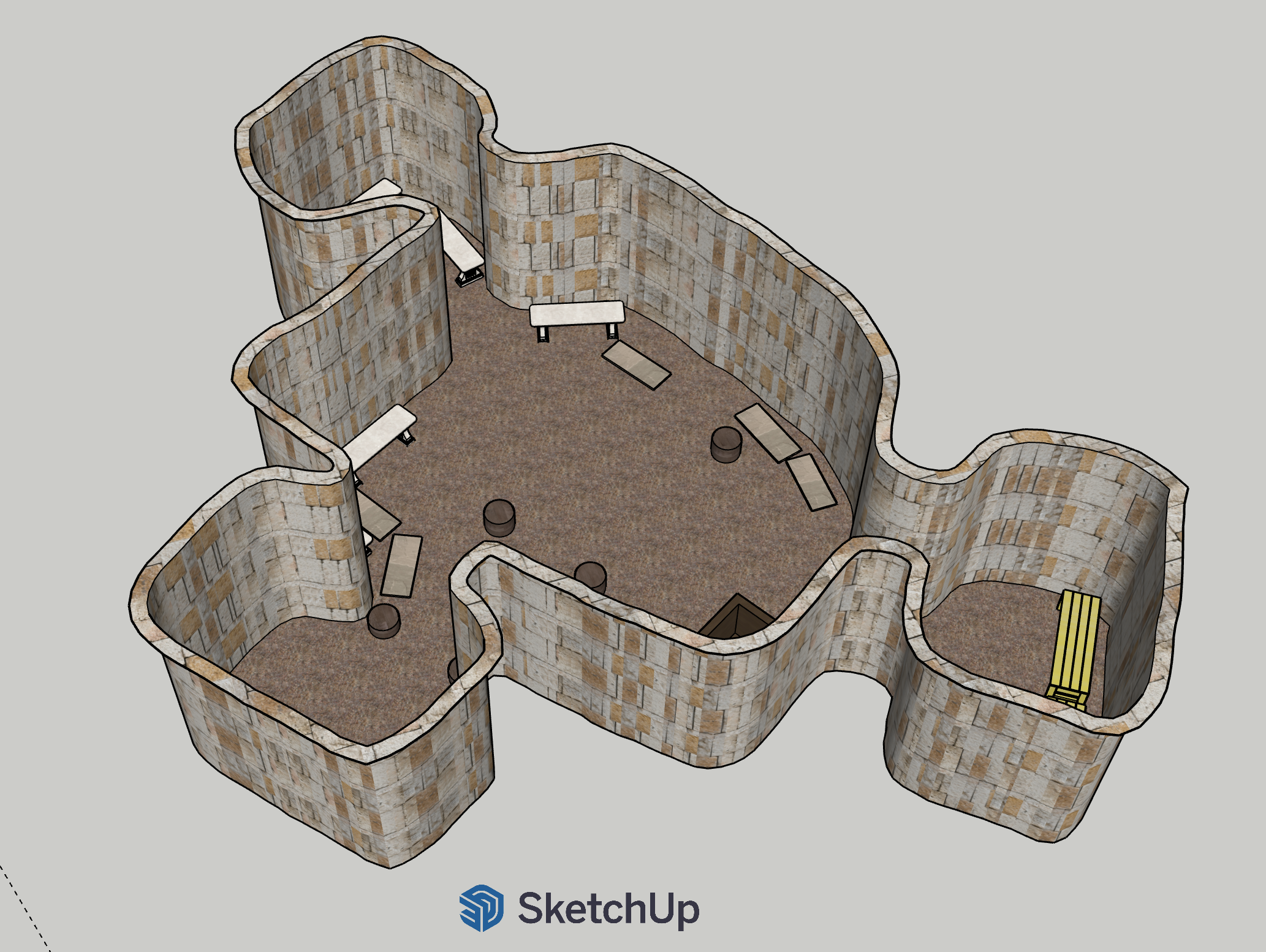
3D model of Qatna's Royal Hypogeum rendered on Sketchup

Beyond its primary function as a tomb, the Royal Hypogeum served as a critical site for the commemoration and perpetuation of ‘cultural memory' through dynastic ritual and ancestor veneration for over four centuries. The long-standing use of the Royal Hypogeum, across multiple generations of the royal family, consolidates the site's functions as a 'memory theatre'. The deliberate curation and display of material culture such as ancient "heirlooms," as well as the walls of the palace itself, served as a physical connection between living rulers and their deceased ancestors, and through that connection legitimized their rule and power over the kingdom. The intentional arrangement of “old objects” in the Late Bronze Age tomb functions as a symbol of the permanence of the ruling family's political power and vital role in the social organization of Qatna. These objects include, among numerous others, 400-year-old basalt ancestor statues in the ante-chamber, Egyptian stone vessels over 1,000 years old and cylinder seals of long-deceased kings like Išḫi-Addu (c. 1783–1776 BCE) used to seal offering jars. Together, these objects represent an elite culture that “is very suitable to act as an instrument of cultural memory and collective identity”. While the placement of “old objects” represented a symbolic connection between the living and the dead, they also facilitated a physical interaction between the two realms. Pottery vessels, flat bowls and animal bones discovered in the royal tomb were used to provide offerings to the dead as part of the kispu-ritual in which living ancestors would dine with their deceased forbearers to honor their memory and strengthen that symbolic connection. Furthermore, parallels between the architectural design and function of the royal hypogeum and the palace above reinforced this symbolic connection. The four columns of the main burial chambers mirror that of the great audience hall (Hall C) at ground level, conceptually creating a “palace of the dead kings” that exists in tandem with the “palace of the living kings” above, strengthening the dynastic identity of Qatna's royal occupants.

=== Culture ===
Due to its location in the middle of the trade network of the ancient world, the cultural and social landscape of the city was complex, as the inhabitants had to deal with traders and envoys who brought with them different customs from distant regions. The inventories of gifts presented to deities from the royal palace indicate that Qatna used the sexagesimal numeral system.

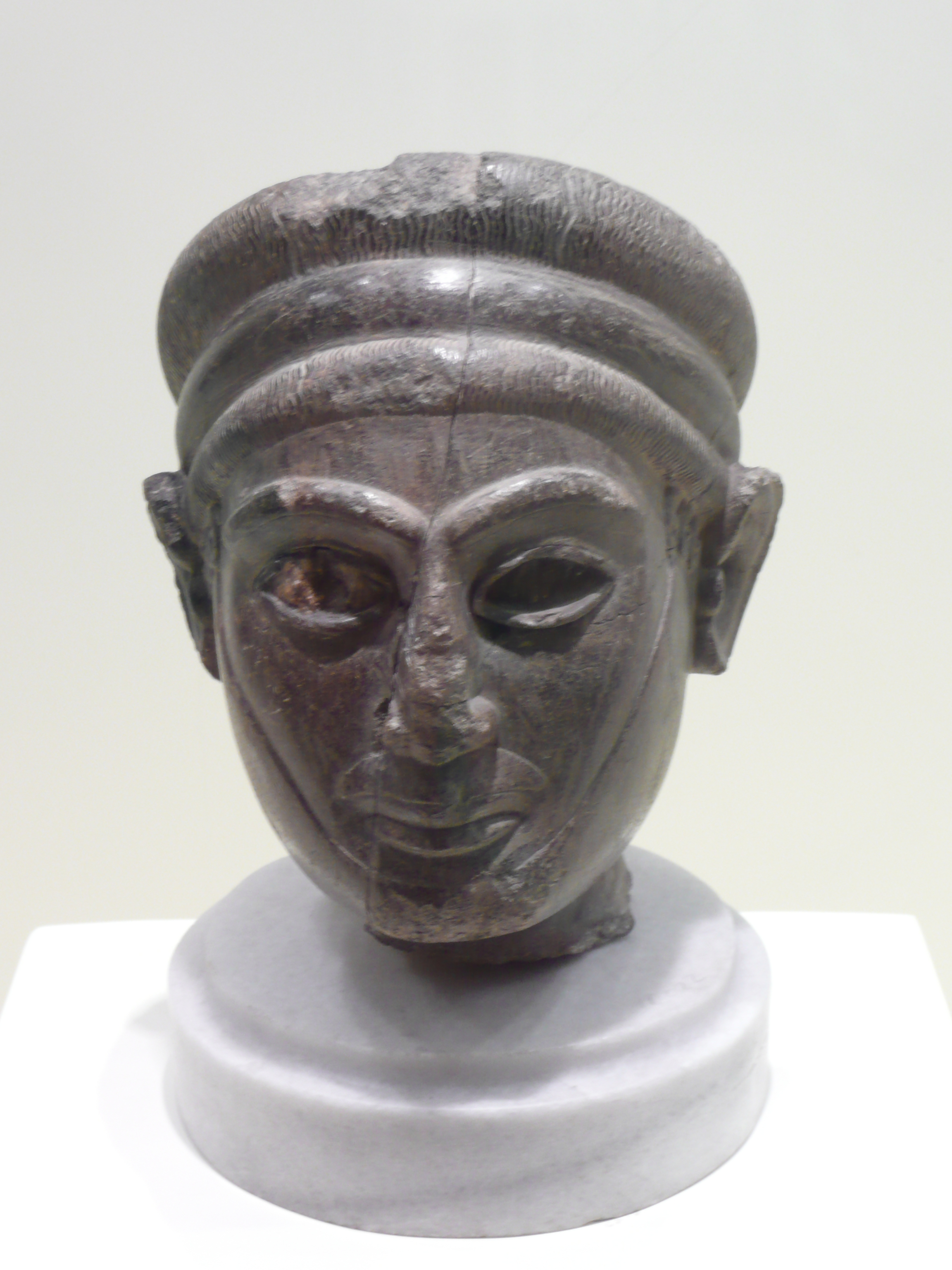
The head of Yarim-Lim of Alalakh closely resembles the royal statues found in the royal hypogeum

Textiles dyed with royal purple, a symbol of social status, were found in the royal hypogeum. Judging by the royal statues found in the royal hypogeum antechamber, a king of Qatna wore clothes different from those worn in Mesopotamia; his robes would have reached his ankles and the hem on his shawl would have been in the shape of a thick rope, while his beard was short and his headdress consisted of a broad band. For royal primary burials, several steps were followed: constructing the burial container, anointing the body with oil, heating the body, leading the burial procession, laying the sarcophagus floor with textiles, burying the body with another layer of textiles, and finally depositing a layer of plants and herbs. Elephants, which lived in western Syria, were esteemed in Qatna and connected to the royal family; they were apparently hunted by the royals and the king himself, as there is evidence that their bones were displayed in the palace; thus, elephants were part of the royal ideology and hunting an elephant was a symbol of prestige that glorified the strength of the king.

An international style in art did not exist in Qatna; (Note: The "international style" of the Eastern Mediterranean and Western Asian art of the second half of the second millennium BC is a heavily debated concept in archaeology; it is defined as an artistic style that is impossible to trace to a certain regional origin as it lacks any regional characters.) instead, a regional hybrid style prevailed where international motifs appear along with regional ones, yet all the pieces reveal enough features to trace them to Qatna. The volute-shaped plant is one of the most widespread international motifs; (Note: The motif is called many names such as the "composite plants", "stylized trees" and the "tree of life".) many pieces from the royal hypogeum were decorated with the motif, but Qatna had its own typical volute, where the crown is a single long lobe with dotted pendants branching out of the corners of the upper volute. The wall painting in Qatna's royal palace attests to contact with the Aegean region; they depict typical Minoan motifs such as palm trees and dolphins.

Qatna also had a distinctive local craftsmanship; the wall paintings in the royal palace, though including Aegean motifs, depict elements that are not typical either in Syria or the Aegean region, such as turtles and crabs. This hybrid style of Qatna prompted Pfälzner to suggest a "craftsmanship interaction model", which is based on the assumption that Aegean artists were employed in local Syrian workshops. Local workshops modeled amber in Syrian style; many pieces were found in the royal hypogeum including 90 beads and a vessel in the shape of a lion head. Ivory was connected to the royal family and the pieces discovered reflect a high level of craftsmanship that was influenced by Egyptian traditions. Jewelry was made to fit local tastes even when the origin of the concept was foreign; an example would be the scarabs, traditional Egyptian objects, that were modified in Qatna by engraving them with local motifs and encasing them with gold, which is atypical for Egyptian specimens. Aside from two golden beads that seem imported from Egypt, no jewelry discovered was of foreign origin.

Typical western Syrian architectural traditions are seen in the eastern palace, which has an asymmetrical plan and tripartite reception halls. The lower city palace also shows typical second-millennium Syrian features, being elongated and lacking the huge courtyards that were a traditional Mesopotamian feature; instead, the palace had several small courtyards spread within it. Qatna's royal palace was unique in its monumental architecture; it had a distinctive foundation and the throne room walls were 9 metres (30 ft) wide, which does not occur elsewhere in the architecture of the ancient Near East. The period following the destruction of the royal palace shows a clear break in culture, evidenced by the poor building materials and architectural techniques.

=== Economy ===
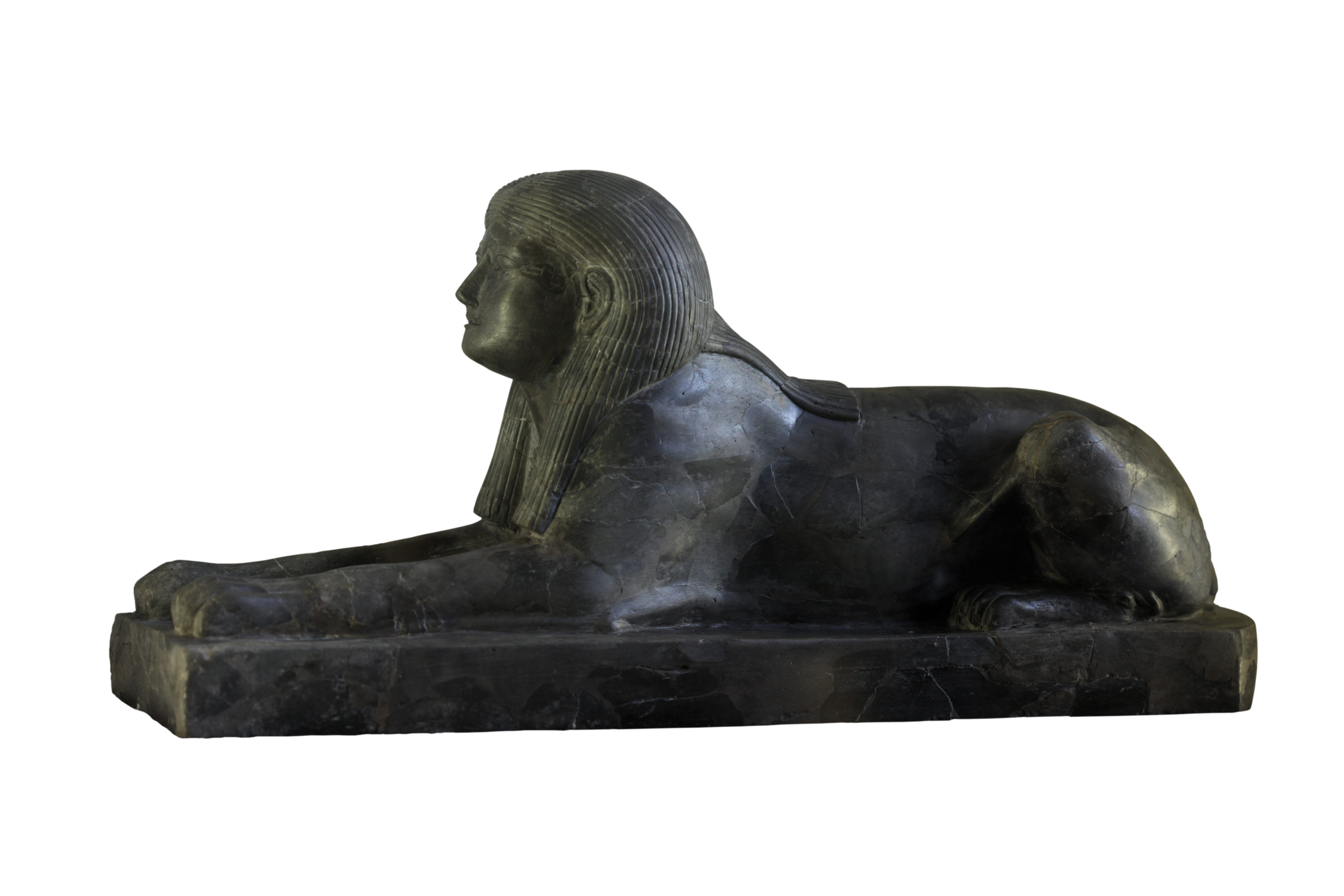
The sphinx of Ita

Finds in "Tomb IV" indicate that Qatna was engaged in long distance trade since its early history. The city's location on the edges of the Syrian steppes turned it into a strategic stop for caravans traveling to the Mediterranean Sea from the east. The countryside surrounding the city provided the key for its success in the Early Bronze Age IV; those lands were capable of supporting both agriculture and pastoralism. Despite the modern scarcity of water, geoarchaeological research on the wadis of the region confirm the abundance of water during the Bronze Age. The land was abundant in pasture lands; when drought struck Mari, Išḫi-Addu allowed its nomads to graze their flocks in Qatna.

The written sources do not offer deep insight on the economy of the kingdom; it counted mainly on agriculture during the Middle Bronze Age but, by the Late Bronze Age, it became based on trade with surrounding regions. Securing raw materials scarce near the city was an important concern for the rulers; basalt was an important building tool and it was probably acquired from the Salamiyah region or Al-Rastan. Calcite was provided from either the Syrian coast or Egypt, amber came from the Baltic region, while regions in modern Afghanistan provided carnelian and lapis-lazul.

The main routes passing Qatna were from Babylon to Byblos through Palmyra, from Ugarit to Emar, and from Anatolia to Egypt. Taxes on caravans crossing the trade routes allowed the city's royalty to get rich; an insight into Qatna's wealth can be acquired from the dowry of Išḫi-Addu's daughter, who was endowed with 10 talents of silver (288 kg) and 5 talents of textiles (worth 144 kg of silver). White horses were among Qatna's most famous exports, in addition to high-quality wines, woods from the nearby Lebanon mountain, and goods, such as chariots, from a highly skilled craft industry.

Many Egyptian imports were found in the city, including the "sphinx of Ita", which represents a daughter of the Egyptian pharaoh Amenemhat II, and a vessel with the name of Senusret I inscribed on it, plus around 50 stone vessels in the royal hypogeum. Another vessel lists the name of Queen Ahmose-Nefertari, wife of 18th dynasty Pharaoh Ahmose I. Two units of weight and payment measurement are prominent in Qatna: the mina and the shekel. The mina had different values from region to region but it seems that in Qatna the preferred value was 470 g, while the preferred value of the shekel is hard to figure.

=== Government ===
The existence of agricultural facilities on the acropolis during the EB IV early city indicates that a central authority oversaw the production process; perhaps the city was a center of one of the princes of Ib'al. Another piece of evidence is "Tomb IV", which contained the remains of 40 people, 300 pottery vessels, weapons and ornaments. The tomb probably belonged to the elite or the ruling family of the city. In the kingdom of Qatna, the crown prince had the city of Nazala as his domain. The palace was mainly a political and administrative institution devoid of religious functions, in contrast to the palace of Mari. (Note: Pfälzner argues that the palace did have religious importance.) In the realm of Hamath, Qatna was an administrative center probably in control of the kingdom's southern regions. During the Assyrian period, Qatna lost its administrative role and even its urban character until its abandonment.

Known monarchs of Qatna are:

Name	Reign	Lifespan
Amut-pi'el I	c. 1783 BC	Died c. 1783 BC
Ishi-Addu	c. 1783 - c. 1772 BC	Died c. 1772 BC
Amut-pi'el II	c. 1772 - c. 1762 BC	Died c. 1762 BC
Naplimma	c. 1450 BC	
Sinadu	c. 1425 BC	
Adad-Nirari	c. 1400 BC	
Idanda	c. 1360 - c. 1350 BC	Died c. 1350 BC
Akizzi	c. 1350 - c. 1345 BC	Died c. 1345 BC

== Excavations ==
Du Mesnil du Buisson led excavations starting in 1924, and annually from 1927 to 1929; the 3rd millennium BC remains provided scarce samples and most of the data come from Tomb IV. In 1994, a Syrian mission led by Michel Al-Maqdissi conducted several surveys and surface excavations, then, in 1999, a joint Syrian–Italian–German mission was formed that was headed by Al-Maqdissi, Daniele Bonacossi, and Pfälzner. Due to the development of the excavations, the Directorate-General of Antiquities and Museums split the mission into Syrian (headed by Al-Maqdissi), Syrian–German (headed by Pfälzner) and Syrian–Italian (headed by Morandi Bonacossi) missions in 2004.

Research was focused on the upper city while the lower city remained largely untouched; by 2006, only 5% of the site's total area had been excavated. The royal palace was split into two excavation areas: operation G covering the western part and operation H covering the eastern part. Operation J covers the summit of the acropolis, while the lower city palace is covered by operation K. One of the most important discoveries came in 2002, when the archive of king Idanda was discovered, containing 67 clay tablets. As a result of the Syrian Civil War, excavations stopped in 2011.

== See also ==
- Al-Rawda
- Amqu
- List of cities of the ancient Near East
- Niya
