= Adad-Nirari of Nuhašše =

Adad-Nirari

King of Nuhasse
- Reign: c. 1350 - c. 1345 BC
- Died: c. 1345 BC

Adad-Nirari or Addu-Nirari (died c. 1345 BC) was a king of Nuhasse in the 14th century BC. The Land of Nuhasse was located southeast of Aleppo and north of Qatna.

Originally part of Mitanni, Adad-Nirari engaged in a military struggle against Hittite, asking Egypt for help. With a coalition of kingdoms, he and his allies was given a chance to change allegiance to Hittite which they rejected and invaded Ugarit who had accepted the offer and become a Hittite vassal. Those actions prompted Suppiluliuma I to invade the region and relive Ugarit. Adad-Nirari's fate is unknown as he disappeared from records.

== Early life and family ==
His identity and succession order is debated as well as the extent of his kingdom, which might have included Qatna.

From Amarna Letter EA51, we learn that Adad-Nirari was a descendant of Tagu (father's father), who had been installed by Thutmose III. In this case "father's father" does not mean grandfather but rather ancestor.

== Reign ==
Adad-Nirari is known through two documents; the letter codenamed (EA 51) sent by the Nuhaššite king to the pharaoh of Egypt, (Note: The date of the letter is debated; it is not known whether the pharaoh was Amenhotep III or Akhenaten.) and the so-called "Niqmaddu Treaty" between Suppiluliuma I and the Ugaritic king Niqmaddu II. Following his second Syrian foray, (Note: The second Syrian foray was supposedly aimed at western Syria but its occurrence is highly debated. Šuppiluliuma I, in his treaty with the Mitannian king Shattiwaza, mentions that he plundered the lands west of the Euphrates (i.e. western Syria) long before his "one year campaign" (which happened after the second Syrian foray), and reached mount Niblani (Lebanon). Michael Astour dates the second foray to year eleven of the Egyptian pharaoh Akhenaten's reign.) Suppiluliuma I sent an offer of alliance to the Nuhassite king; Adad-Nirari rejected, and despite being a vassal of Mitanni, he sent the letter codenamed (EA 51) to ask Egypt for help and troops. Adad-Nirari might have asked Mitanni for help but the latter was unable to send it and it seems that Egypt did not respond as well.

Amarna Letter EA 51 ^{O004-011}: [L]ook, when Thutmosis (III), the king of the land of Egypt (LUGAL KUR mi-iṣ-ri), your father’s father, invested Ta[gu], my father’s [fa]ther, with kingship in the land of Nuhasse (KUR nu-ḫa-aš-še) and placed oil upon his head and said as follows: “He whom the king of the land of E[gypt] has invested with kingship [and] placed [oil on his head, no]one [ should ...]. He gave [...] to him, together with [...]. Now [...]

Nuhasse revolted against the Hittites, but Ugarit, which was sent an alliance offer by Suppiluliuma I, eventually accepted the vassalage; Adad-Nirari allied himself with Niya and Mukiš then attacked Ugarit. According to Niqmaddu II, the troops of Adad-Nirari and his allies seized the cities of Ugarit, took booty and devastated the land. Thomas Richter believes that the coalition's attack triggered Šuppiluliuma's first Syrian war. (Note: The one year campaign, also known as the first Syrian war, was a direct confrontation between Mitanni and Šuppiluliuma and is given different dates by various scholars; William J. Murnane place it at any point between Akhenaten's 9th and 14th year. A more suitable date would be the beginning of Akhenaten 12th year on the throne.) The Hittite king, after receiving an appeal from his Ugaritic vassal, sent an army which defeated the coalition; the fate of Adad-Nirari is unknown as the Hittites make no mention of what happened to him.

== Chronological order and identity ==
=== As king of Nuhasse ===
There is a great deal of confusion over the identity of Adad-Nirari as king of Nuhasse and his position in the succession of the Nuhassite monarchs. The Hittite documents mention two kings of Nuhasse in the first Syrian war; in the Niqmaddu treaty, "Adad-Nirari" is mentioned. In the Hittite-Mitannian treaty (the Shattiwaza treaty, concluded during the second Syrian war), (Note: The second Syrian war, also known as the Hurrian war, was a conflict that lasted six years and brought Syria firmly under the rule of Šuppiluliuma I; it started at least ten years following Akhenaten's death.) and the treaty between Suppiluliuma I and the Nuhassite king Tette, "Šarrupši" is mentioned. Most scholars agree that the events mentioned in the Niqqmadu and Shattiwaza treaties depict the events of the first Syrian war. Judging by letter (EA 51), Adad-Nirari was the king during the first Syrian war. However, the treaty with Tette makes it clear that Sarrupsi was the king when Suppiluliuma I attacked Isuwa, an event which started the first Syrian war as the Shattiwaza treaty shows. Many scholars dealt with the problem and offered different and contradictory opinions:

- Adad-Nirari preceded Šarrupši: according to Richter, in the beginning of the first Syrian war, the king of Nuhasse was Adad-nirari and Šarrupši was a Hittite protégé put on the throne by Šuppiluliuma. Richter does not explain the Shattiwaza treaty's silence over the fate of Adad-Nirari. Amnon Altman suggested that Šarrupši was a claimant to the throne and the reason for not mentioning the fate of Adad-Nirari in the treaty of Shattiwaza is, according to Altman: "Adad-Nirari was not mentioned, because he managed to escape from the Hittites, and Šuppiluliuma for some reason took it as a disgrace and sign of not full submission of Nuhasse and thus decided not to mention Adad-Nirari in the Šattiwaza treaty at all." Altman himself admits that his answer is inadequate.
- Šarrupši preceded Adad-Nirari: Trevor Bryce considered Šarrupši to have accepted the Hittite vassalage causing Tushratta of Mitanni to kill him; he was succeeded by Adad-Nirari who also belonged to the royal family and was willing to be a vassal of Mitanni. Jacques Freu suggested that the date of the Nuhaššite attack on Ugarit followed the end of the first Syrian war, and took place at the beginning of the six-year war (second Syrian war). Freu's hypothesis have Šarrupši ruling during the first Syrian war, a predecessor of Adad-Nirari.
- Adad-Nirari and Šarrupši are the same person: Daria Gromova suggested that Adad-Nirari was the Amorite name of the king while Šarrupši was his Hurrian name. This was not a unique situation in the Near East when a ruling class had a foreign ethnic roots which was the case in Nuhasse as the population was West-Semitic while the monarchs had Hurrian names.
- Adad-Nirari ruled simultaneously with Šarrupši: Horst Klengel suggested this solution but this does not explain why the treaty of Shattiwaza makes no mention of Adad-Nirari who was the main insurgent from Nuhasse.
- Adad-Nirari interrupted the reign of Šarrupši: also suggested by Klengel who maintained that Adad-Nirari usurped Šarrupši's throne for a short period before being overthrown and Šarrupši reinstated.

=== As a possible king of Qatna ===
The inventories of Qatna mentions a king named Adad-Nirari; Michael Astour suggested identifying the Qatanite king with the Nuhaššite monarch and was followed by Richter, who believes that Adad-Nirari ruled Qatna through a Shakkanakku (military governor) called Lullu mentioned in the Qatanite inventories. The hypothesis of Richter presents Adad-Nirari of Nuhasse as the ruler of a vast state, the second Syrian power after Mitanni, who was removed by the Hittites and had his kingdom split into three parts: Nuhasse itself, Qatna and Ugulzat.

The Shattiwaza treaty clearly mentioned Qatna as a different realm from Nuhasse during the first Syrian war; If Qatna was part of the Nuhaššite kingdom, its submission to the Hittites would not have been mentioned separately. Freu rejected Richter's hypothesis; citing different arguments, he concluded that Adad-Nirari of Nuhasse was a contemporary of Idadnda of Qatna, a successor of the Qatanite Adad-Nirari.
