= Ib'al =

Ib'al was the name used by Ebla in the 24th century BC to indicate a confederation of tribes occupying the steppic region south of Ebla; the region included small villages and towns. Qatna could have been one of the urban centers in the region.

Ebla and Mari were engaged in a long war and Ib'al was drawn into; during the reign of the Eblaite king Isar-Damu, repeated campaigns over the course of four years were aimed at the confederation and ended with the Ib'al defeat. Following the war with Ebla, Ib'al became an Eblaite ally and acted as such during a campaign against Mari. Ib'al maintained a peaceful relation with Ebla until the latter collapse, and the Ebla archive mentions the names of seven of its sheikhs.
