= Idanda =

King of Qatna

King of Qatna
- Reign: c. 1360 - c. 1350 BC
- Successor: Akizzi
- Died: c. 1350 BC
- Issue: Amut-pa-il

Idanda (died c. 1350 BC) was a king of Qatna in the middle of the 14th century BC. An archive of tablets discovered in the royal palace mention him with the name Idanda while in other sources he is mentioned as Idadda. His name is Amorite, and he claimed to be the son of a king named Ulasuda whose position in Qatna is uncertain. His son was named Amut-pa-il.
