= Naplimma =

King of Qatna
- Reign: c. 1450 BC
- Successor: Sinadu
- Issue: Sinadu

Naplimma (fl. c. 1450 BC) was a king of Qatna around 1450 BC. The Egyptian pharaoh Thutmose III recorded his subjugation of Qatna and attending an archery contest with its king; Naplimma lived 5 generations before the Amarna Age and he could very well be the king who entertained Thutmose III. His name was West Semitic. Inventories of gifts offered to the goddess Ninegal discovered in Qatna have Naplimma as the earliest king to donate which might indicate that he started the donations tradition. He was succeeded by his son Sinadu.
