= Akizzi =

Historical ruler of Qatna

King of Qatna
- Reign: c. 1350 - 1345 BC
- Predecessor: Idanda
- Died: c. 1345 BC

Akizzi (Akk. ^{m}a-ki-iz-zi; died c. 1345 BC) was the King of Qatna around 1350-1345 BC. He is also known as a writer of several of the Amarna Letters, in which he requested aid from the pharaoh against invaders. He was a successor of Idanda. While Idanda is known from an archive in Qatna, no archive has been found within Qatna that contained letters belonging to Akizzi; instead, letters Akizzi sent were found in Amarna.

It is unclear if Akizzi used the titles LU (man) or LUGAL (king) for himself. He used the former title for surrounding pettery rulers, and the latter title for himself in one letter (Amarna Letter EA 57).

== Reign ==
As Mitanni lost control of the territory west of the Euphrates River, the former vassal states were faced with trying to align themselves with Egypt or submit to Suppiluliuma I of Hittite.

Akizzi wrote several letters of the Amarna letters correspondence. Here he pleaded for help from Egypt against the Hittite invasion into former Mitanni territory. Even earlier Pharaohs such as Thutmose III had campaigned in this region, which Akizzi tries to refer to as a cause for the Egyptian pharaoh to come and "reclaim his" territory.

=== Amarna Letter EA52 ===
A fragmentary text in Akkadian with some Hurrian glosses.

To the King of the Land of Egypt (KUR mi-is-ri^{ki}), a message from Akizzi. Akizzi wants the King of Egypt to aid him in the wars triggered in Syria by the Hittites following the fall of Mitanni. It mentions the (King of) the Land of Hatti (i.e. Suppiluliuma I). It also mentions Biryawaza (^{m}bi-ru-a-za).

=== Amarna Letter EA53 ===
This is a letter from Akizzi to the Pharaoh of Egypt (^{m}nam-ḫur-ia). The pharaoh is often identified as Amenhotep IV, but could rather be Tutankhamen. It mentions Etakkama of Kadesh and the King of the Land of Hittite. Akizzi begs the Great King of Egypt for help not to become part of Hittite.

=== Amarna Letter EA54 ===
"To the King (LUGAL), my lord, a message from Akizzi your servant".

The letter mentions the arriving armies of Etakkama, Man of Kadesh (^{m}a-i-tu-ga-ma LU ^{URU}Qi2-in-sa3), Arzawya, Man of Ruhizu, Tiwate, Man of Labana, and King of the Land of Hatti.

=== Amarna Letter EA55 ===
This is a letter from Akizzi to the Pharaoh of Egypt (^{m}nam-ḫur-ia). The king is often identified as Amenhotep IV, but could rather be Tutankhamen.

=== Amarna Letter EA56+361 ===
Speak to the King (LUGAL), my lord, a message from Akizzi, your servant.

It mentions Taššu and Etakkama of Kadesh.

"Look, Etakkama seized all of our cities, but still we are the servants of my lord (...) the servants of Arsawuya of the city of Ruhizu (...) with Etakkama (...) they repeatedly attack me..."

=== Amarna Letter EA57 ===
A very fragmentary text.

"...Puhura...Akizzi, the King of Qatna...the King of Barga..., and he had regularly gone... my lord's huradu-soldiers...to Puhuru... he brought me... to Puhuru". The letter mentions the city Tunip^{ki} and a person named ^{m}Shumitti.
