= Adad-Nirari of Qatna =

King of Qatna in the 14th century BC

Adad-Nirari

King of Qatna
- Reign: c. 1400 BC
- Spouse: Pizallum

Adad-Nirari or H̱addu-Nirari (fl. c. 1400 BC) was a king of Qatna in the 14th century BC.

== Reign ==
Adad-Nirari is an Akkadian name. The king reigned for 45 years in the 14th century BC, and was mentioned in the inventories of Ninegal, found in Qatna. A tablet from Qatna records him stationing an army of chariot archers in the city of Tukad, in Mount Lebanon. The name of his queen was Pizallum.

== Theories ==
=== Identity ===
Michael Astour suggested identifying Adad-Nirari with Adad-Nirari of Nuhašše; a hypothesis supported by Thomas Richter, who believes that Adad-Nirari ruled Qatna through a shakkanakku (military governor) called Lullu, citing that the latter's name appears in the Qatanite inventories at the time of Adad-Nirari. According to Richter, Adad-Nirari of Nuhašše ruled the second Syrian power after Mitanni, and was removed by the Hittites which gave Qatna its independence back.

This theory is debated; the Shattiwaza treaty between Mitanni and the Hittites mentioned Qatna independently from Nuhašše during the Hittite king Šuppiluliuma I's first Syrian war; If Qatna was part of the Nuhaššite kingdom, its submission to the Hittites would not have been mentioned separately. Jacques Freu rejected Richter's hypothesis; citing different arguments, he concluded that Adad-Nirari of Nuhašše was a contemporary of Idadnda of Qatna who ruled during the first Syrian war, a successor of the Qatanite Adad-Nirari.
