= Royal Hypogeum of Qatna =

Bronze age underground tomb

Coordinates: 34.8357°N 36.8632°E

The Royal Hypogeum of Qatna (tomb VI) is located beneath the northwest wing of the royal palace in Qatna (modern Syria). It was discovered at the depth of 12 metres (39 ft) below the palace in the season of 2002 as part of the 'Operation G' program. This discovery at the northern edge of the palace came as a complete surprise to the excavators. No indications for such a structure had been observed in previous excavations at the site. The structure is unique in the context of other Bronze Age palaces anywhere, so nothing suggested such a feature before.

The intact tomb contained particularly rich grave goods. There were abundant amounts of gold and precious stone beads, several decorated golden plaques, a modelled gold hand, and a lion head of amber. Many more remarkable objects have been found here, and they continue to be objects of study.

The hypogeum was in use for around 350 years. The destruction of the palace around 1350 BC also marked the end of the tomb's use.

Two ancestor statues of basalt flanked the door that leads to the inner chambers. These sitting statues, about 80 cm high, were found by excavators in their original position. They were part of the ancestor worship cult and ceremonies.

The tomb consists of four chambers cut in the bedrock beneath the palace's foundations, and a corridor, 40 metres (130 ft) long, that connects it to hall A of the royal palace. Four doors divide the corridor, which then takes a turn to the east and stops abruptly; an antechamber 5 metres (16 ft) beneath the floor of the corridor follows and a wooden stair is used to descend to it, after which a door leads to the burial chambers. Bodies of both genders and different ages were interred in it; a minimum of 19–24 individuals were found in the tomb.
