= William J. Murnane =

American historian

Portrait of William J. Murnane

William Joseph Murnane (March 22, 1945 – November 17, 2000) was an American Egyptologist and author of a number of books and monographs on Ancient Egypt. He was director of the Great Hypostyle Hall Project at Luxor Karnak Temple, was a research associate and held a Dunavant Professorship in the History Department of the Institute of Egyptian Art & Archaeology at the University of Memphis. Several of his scholarly monographs are used as standard references by historians and philologists whilst more popular works, which drew on his considerable knowledge of Ancient Egyptian monuments, are used by tourists.

== Life and work ==
Murnane was born in White Plains, New York, in 1945 but at 18 months old moved with his parents to in Venezuela, where he was raised. On returning to the United States at 13 he attended Saint Anselm College in New Hampshire, where he showed an early interest in Egyptian hieroglyphs and wrote letters to his sister using the ancient language. He supplemented his income by teaching Spanish and graduated in 1966.

In 1972 he joined the staff of the Epigraphic Survey at Chicago House in Luxor, Egypt, and gained his doctorate (with honours) from the University of Chicago the following year with his thesis Ancient Egyptian Coregencies. His epigraphic work included documenting the texts and depictions from major temples in Karnak, Khonsu, and Luxor as well as from the small temple at Medinet Habu. Along with Charles van Siclen, he located and copied the texts at Akhenaten's capital city and published them in 1993 as The Boundary Stelae of Akhenaten. He also contributed translations and commentaries for folio editions publications produced by the Oriental Institute.

He remained at Luxor until 1986, when he was appointed Visiting associate professor of Egyptology at the University of California, Berkeley. The following year he was employed by Memphis State University (later called University of Memphis) in their history department and was appointed full professor in 1994. He was on the editorial boards of several journals, including JARCE, JEA and KMT. He was also a member of the boards of the National Endowment for the Humanities and the Michela Schiff Giorgini Foundation for the review of grants. ". He was the director of the Karnak Great Hypostyle Hall Project for over twenty years, seeking to document all the texts and depictions on one of the most frequently visited monuments before they vanished.

Murnane won numerous awards and prestigious grants during his career. He was awarded the Distinguished Research Award of the College of Arts and Sciences in 1994. He was presented with: the Eminent Faculty Research Award (the University of Memphis’ highest distinction) and was the winner of three University faculty research awards.

He has been described as “the ideal colleague, a real "gentleman scholar"”. In 2009, a volume of essays by scholars to honour the memory William Murnane was published "Causing His Name to Live: Studies in Egyptian Epigraphy and History in Memory of William J. Murnane PDF".

== Select books and articles ==
- Ancient Egyptian Coregencies The Oriental Institute of the University of Chicago, Studies in Ancient Oriental Civilization 40, 290 pages, 1977 ISSN 0081-7554 PDF
- United with Eternity: A Concise Guide to the Monuments of Medinet Habu, The Oriental Institute of the University of Chicago, American University in Cairo Press, 96 pages, 1980 PDF
- The El Amarna Boundary Stelae Project 1983-1984, University of Chicago, PDF
- *For His Ka: Essays Offered in Memory of Klaus Baer, The Oriental Institute of the University of Chicago 37, Studies in Ancient Oriental Civilization 55 (1994) Chapter 13: Too Many High Priests? pp.187-197 PDF
- The Penguin Guide to Ancient Egypt (London, 1983; revised 1996) ISBN 0140463267
- The Road to Kadesh: A Historical Interpretation of the Battle Reliefs of King Sety I at Karnak, The Oriental Institute of the University of Chicago, Studies in Ancient Oriental Civilization 42, The Oriental Institute of the University of Chicago, 272 pages, 1985 PDF
- The Boundary Stelae of Akhenaten (1993) ISBN 0710304641 Preface and Chapter 1 Only PDF & Endnotes Only
- Texts from the Amarna Period (Atlanta, 1995; revised 1998) ISBN 1555409660
- William J. Murnane, Peter J. Brand, Januzs Karkowski & Richard Jaeschke, THE KARNAK HYPOSTYTE HALL PROJECT: (1992-2002), 49 pages, PDF
- Harold Hayden Nelson, William J. Murnane (editor), The Great Hypostyle Hall at Karnak: The Wall Reliefs Vol.1 Part 1 Oriental Institute Publications Volume 106, 348 pages, 1981 PDF
- Peter J. Brand & Rosa E. Feleg & William J. Murnane, The Great Hypostyle Hall in the Temple of Karnak: Translation and Commentary Vol.1 Part 2 Oriental Institute Publications Volume 142, 448 pages, 2018 PDF
- Peter J. Brand & Rosa E. Feleg & William J. Murnane, The Great Hypostyle Hall in the Temple of Karnak: Figures and Plates Vol.1 Part 2 Oriental Institute Publications Volume 142, 448 pages, 2018 PDF
