= Zakkur =

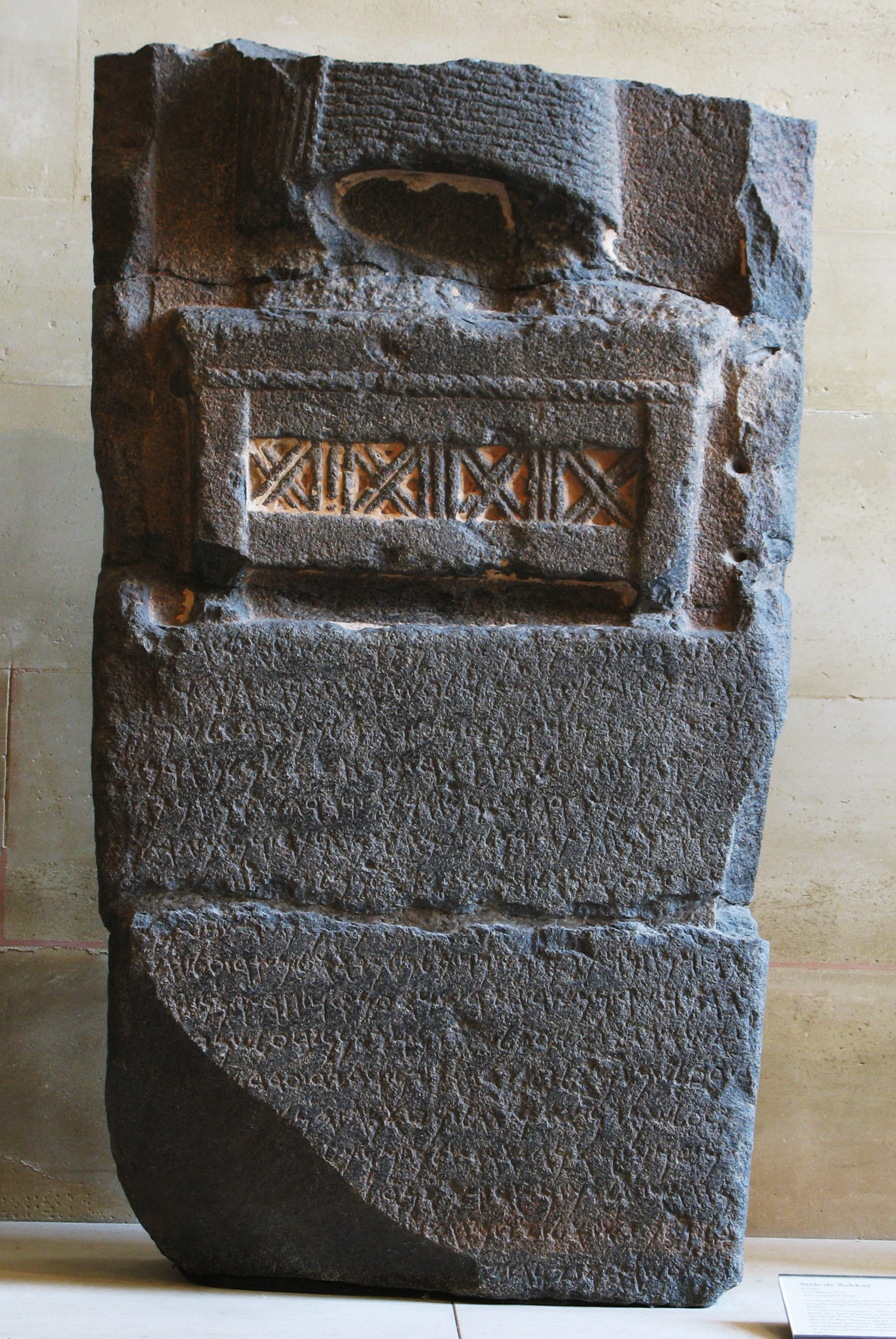
Stele of Zakkur at the Louvre

Zakkur (or Zakir) was the ancient king of Hamath and Luhuti (also known as Nuhašše) in Syria. He ruled around 785 BC. Most of the information about him comes from his basalt stele, known as the Stele of Zakkur.

== History ==
Irhuleni and his son Uratami were Kings of Hamath prior to Zakkur. Irhuleni led a coalition against the Assyrian expansion under Shalmaneser III. Their coalition succeeded in 853 BC in the Battle of Qarqar. Later Irhuleni maintained good relations with Assyria.

Not so much is known about the background of Zakkur. He is first mentioned in Assyrian sources probably in 785 BC, in the last years of Adad-nirari III. Adad-nirari ordered his commander Shamshi-ilu to mediate the border dispute between Zakkur and Atarshumki I of Arpad.

Aramaic kingdoms in the 9th century BC

Zakkur appears to have been a native of 'Ana' (which may refer to the city of Hana/Terqa) on the Euphrates River, that was within the influence of Assyria.

Zakkur is believed to have founded the Aramean dynasty at the city of Hamath (now known as Hama). Some scholars consider him as an usurper, because, previously, Hamath was ruled by the kings with Luwian or neo-Hittite names.

Luhuti, over which Zakkur came to rule, is known primarily from Assyrian inscriptions. Nevertheless, these inscriptions describe Luhuti as a country with many cities and troops.

The capital of Luhuti was the city of Hazrik (modern Tell Afis; it was known as Hatarikka for the Assyrians), located 45 kilometers south of Aleppo. This is where the Zakkur Stele was found.

Luhuti was incorporated into Hamath around 796 BC; it formed the northern province of the kingdom.

=== Events described in the Stele ===
Zakkur was besieged in Tell Afis by a coalition of Aramean kings incited by Ben-Hadad III of Aram-Damascus, and led by the king of Bit Agusi. Zakkur survived the siege and commemorated the event by commissioning the Stele of Zakkur.

== See also ==
- List of Aramean kings
- Aram (biblical region)

== Bibliography ==
- Scott B. Noegel, The Zakkur Inscription. In: Mark W. Chavalas, ed. The Ancient Near East: Historical Sources in Translation. London: Blackwell (2006), 307–311.
- M. Henri Pognon, Inscriptions semitiques de la Syrie, de la Mesopotamie at de la region de Mossoul, Paris, 1907 (and 1908). The volume contains 116 inscriptions most of them in Syriac.
- James J. Montgomery, A New Aramaic Inscription of Biblical Interest in The Biblical World, Vol. XXXIII, Febr. 1909, p. 79-84.
- Pritchard, The Ancient Near East, ANET 501-502
