= Ancient Semitic-speaking peoples =

Residents of the ancient Near East until the end of antiquity

Approximate historical distribution of the Semitic languages in the Ancient Near East

Ancient Semitic-speaking peoples or Proto-Semitic people were speakers of Semitic languages who lived throughout the ancient Near East and North Africa, including the Levant, Mesopotamia, Anatolia, the Arabian Peninsula and Carthage from the 3rd millennium BC until the end of antiquity, with some, such as Arabs, Arameans, Assyrians, Jews, Mandaeans, Samaritans and Amharic/Ethio-Semitic speakers having a historical continuum into the present day.

Their languages are usually divided into two main branches: East and West Semitic. The oldest attested forms of Semitic date to the early to mid-3rd millennium BCE (the Early Bronze Age) in Mesopotamia, the northwest Levant and southeast Anatolia. Perhaps the earliest attested inscription of any Semitic language was written in the Proto-Sinaitic script in King Unas' Tomb in Egypt around the middle of the 3rd millennium BCE.

Speakers of East Semitic included the people of the Akkadian Empire, Ebla, Assyria and Babylonia, but the branch's languages have since fallen out of use. Akkadian influenced East Aramaic and perhaps Dilmun.

West Semitic includes Central Semitic, which combines the Northwest Semitic languages and Arabic. Speakers of Northwest Semitic were the Canaanites (including the Phoenicians, Carthaginians, Amorites, Edomites, Moabites and the Hebrews/Israelites), the Arameans and the Ugarites. Arabic, Aramaic, Hebrew and Maltese remain spoken to this day. Another major Central Semitic language, Old South Arabian languages, were spoken in the southern Arabian Peninsula in civilizations such as Sheba, Magan, Ubar and possibly Meluhha, and the speakers of Modern South Arabian languages of Yemen, Oman and the Ethiopian Semitic languages.

Many of the groups discussed in this article are known through traditional ethnographic categories inherited from biblical, classical or political sources both ancient and modern. Modern scholarship often emphasizes the complex nature of ancient identities in the same way people can keep true to multiple nationalities or speak multiple languages simultaneously. Linguistic, cultural, political, and ethnic boundaries did not always coincide, and should not necessarily be understood as corresponding to discrete or homogeneous "peoples".

== Origins ==
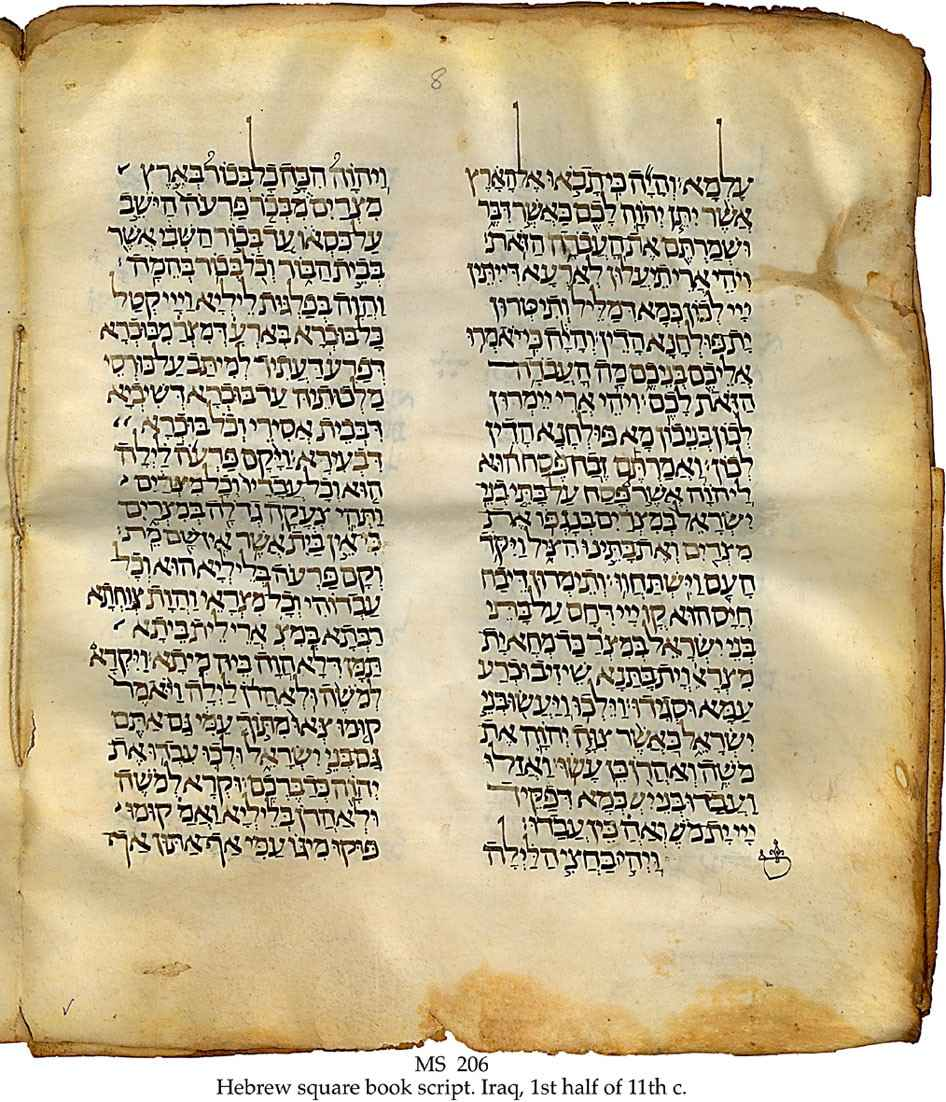
11th-century manuscript of the Hebrew Bible with Targum

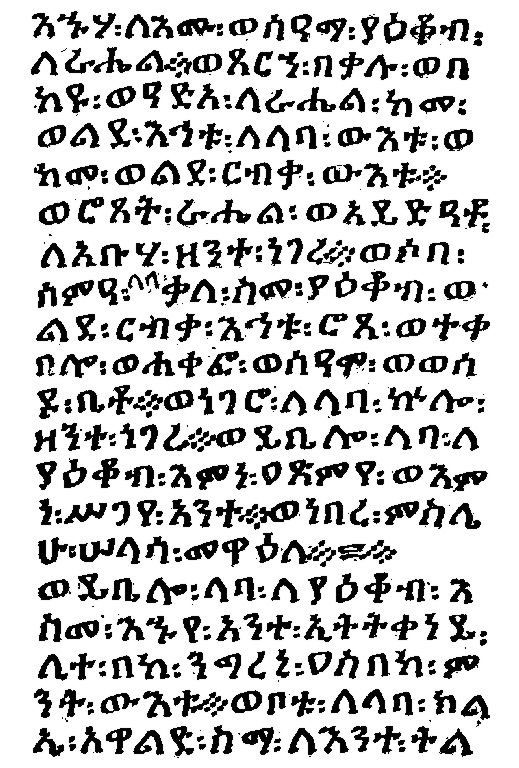
Page from a 15th-century Bible in Ge'ez (Ethiopia)

There are several locations proposed as possible sites for prehistoric origins of Semitic-speaking peoples: Mesopotamia, the Levant, Egypt and the Sinai Peninsula, the Eastern Mediterranean, Eritrea and Ethiopia, the Arabian Peninsula, and North Africa.

A popular view claims that the Semitic languages originated in the Levant circa 3800 BC, and were later also introduced to the Horn of Africa—often associated with the southern Arabian peninsula—in approximately 800 BC, and to North Africa and southern Spain with the founding of Phoenician colonies such as ancient Carthage in the ninth century BC and Cádiz in the tenth century BC.

Some assign the arrival of Semitic speakers in the Horn of Africa to a much earlier date, circa 1300 to 1000 BC, and many scholars believe that Semitic originated from an offshoot of a still earlier language in North Africa, perhaps in the southeastern Sahara, and that the process of desertification may have caused its speakers to migrate in the fourth millennium BC—some southeast into what is now Eritrea and Ethiopia, and others northeast out of North Africa into Canaan, Syria and the Mesopotamian valley.

The Semitic family is a member of the larger Afroasiatic family, all of whose other five or more branches have their origin in North Africa or the Maghreb. Largely for this reason, the ancestors of Proto-Semitic speakers were originally believed by some to have first arrived in the Middle East from North Africa, possibly as part of the operation of the Saharan pump, around the late Neolithic. Diakonoff sees Semitic originating between the Nile Delta and Canaan as the northernmost branch of Afroasiatic. Identification of the hypothetical proto-Semitic region of origin is therefore dependent on the larger geographic distributions of the other language families within Afroasiatic, whose origins are also hotly debated. According to Christy G. Turner II, there is an archaeological and physical anthropological reason for a relation between the modern Semitic-speaking populations of the Levant and the Natufian culture.

In one interpretation, Proto-Semitic itself is assumed to have reached the Arabian Peninsula by approximately the 4th millennium BC, from which Semitic daughter languages continued to spread outwards. When written records began in the late fourth millennium BC, the Semitic-speaking Akkadians (Assyrians and Babylonians) were entering Mesopotamia from the deserts to the west, and were probably already present in places such as Ebla in Syria. Akkadian personal names began appearing in written records in Mesopotamia from the late 29th century BC.

The earliest positively proven historical attestation of any Semitic people comes from 30th century BC Mesopotamia entering the region originally dominated by the people of Sumer, who spoke the language isolate Sumerian.

== Bronze Age ==
Between the 30th and 20th centuries BC, Semitic languages were spoken and recorded throughout much of the Ancient Near East, including the Levant, Mesopotamia, Anatolia, Arabia, and the Sinai Peninsula. The earliest written evidence of them is found in the Fertile Crescent (Mesopotamia) c. the 30th century BC, an area encompassing Sumer, the Akkadian Empire and other civilizations of Assyria and Babylonia along the Tigris and Euphrates (modern Iraq, northeast Syria, southeast Turkey and the fringe of northwest Iran), followed by historical written evidence from the Levant (known also as Canaan; now Israel, Palestine, western Jordan, Lebanon, and southern Syria ), Sinai Peninsula, southern and eastern Anatolia (modern Turkey) and the northeast Arabian Peninsula. No written or archaeological evidence for Semitic languages exists in North Africa, the Horn of Africa, Malta, or the Caucasus during this period.

The earliest known Akkadian inscription was found on a bowl at Ur, addressed to the very early pre-Sargonic king Meskiang-nunna of Ur by his queen Gan-saman, who is thought to have been from Akkad. However, some of the names appearing on the Sumerian King List as prehistoric rulers of Kish have been held to indicate a Semitic presence even before this, as early as the 30th or 29th century BC. By the mid-third millennium BC, many states and cities in Mesopotamia had come to be ruled or dominated by Akkadian-speaking Semites, including Assyria, Eshnunna, the Akkadian Empire, Kish, Isin, Ur, Uruk, Adab, Nippur, Ekallatum, Nuzi, Akshak, Eridu and Larsa, and also Dilmun to the south of Mesopotamia. During this period (c. 27th to 26th century BC), another East Semitic-speaking people, the Eblaites, appear in the historical record from northern Syria. They founded the state of Ebla, whose Eblaite language was closely related to the Akkadian of Mesopotamia. The Akkadians, Assyrians, Babylonians and Eblaites were the first Semitic-speaking people to use writing, using the cuneiform script originally developed by the Sumerians c. 3500 BC, with the first writings in Akkadian dating from c. 2800 BC. The last Akkadian inscriptions date from the late first century AD, and cuneiform script in the second century AD, both in Mesopotamia, and Akkadian grammatical features and words endure in the East Aramaic dialects of the still extant Assyrians.

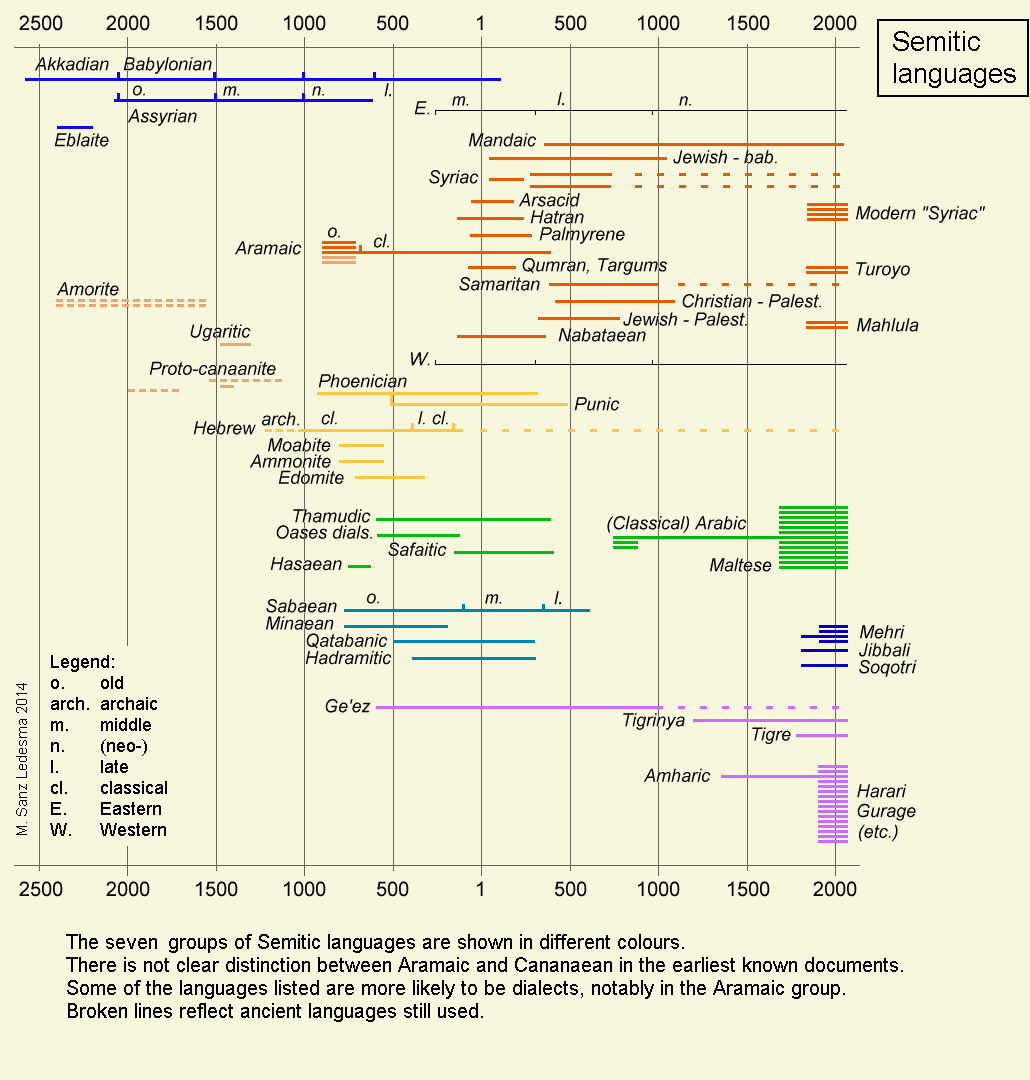
Chronology of Semitic languages

By the late third millennium BC, East Semitic languages such as Akkadian and Eblaite, were dominant in Mesopotamia and north east Syria, while West Semitic languages, such as Amorite, Canaanite and Ugaritic, were probably spoken from Syria to the Arabian Peninsula. However Ancient South Arabian is considered by most people to be a South Semitic language despite the sparsity of data. The Akkadian language of Akkad, Assyria and Babylonia had become the dominant literary language of the Fertile Crescent, using the cuneiform script that was adapted from the Sumerians. The Old Assyrian period, Babylonian Empire, and in particular the Middle Assyrian Empire (1365–1050 BC) facilitated the use of Akkadian as a lingua franca in many regions outside its homeland. The related, but more sparsely attested, Eblaite disappeared with the city, and Amorite is attested only from proper names in Mesopotamian records.

For the 2nd millennium, more data are available, thanks to the Egyptian hieroglyphics-derived Proto-Sinaitic script. Texts in the Proto-Canaanite alphabet from around 1500 BCE yield the first undisputed attestations of West Semitic languages, although earlier testimonies are possibly preserved in Middle Bronze Age alphabets. This was followed by the much more extensive Ugaritic tablets of northern Syria from around 1300 BC. Incursions of nomadic and West Semitic-speaking Arameans and Suteans began around this time, followed by Chaldeans in the late 10th century BC. Akkadian continued to flourish, splitting into Babylonian and Assyrian dialects.

Of the West Semitic-speaking peoples who occupied what is today Syria (excluding the East Semitic-speaking Upper Mesopotamia), Israel, Lebanon, Jordan, Palestine, and the Sinai Peninsula, the earliest references concern the Canaanite-speaking Amorites (known as "Martu" or "Amurru" by the Mesopotamians) of northern and eastern Syria, and date from the 24th century BC in Mesopotamian annals. The technologically advanced Sumerians and Akkadians of Mesopotamia mention the West Semitic-speaking peoples disparagingly: "The MAR.TU who know no grain... The MAR.TU who know no house nor town, the boors of the mountains... The MAR.TU who digs up truffles... who does not bend his knees (to cultivate the land), who eats raw meat, who has no house during his lifetime, who is not buried after death." These Amorites would eventually found Amorite states in Mesopotamia including Babylon, where they became Akkadianized, adopted Mesopotamian culture and language, and blended into the indigenous population. Babylon became the centre of a short lived but influential Babylonian Empire in the 18th century BC, and after this, Lower Mesopotamia came to be known as Babylonia, with Babylon superseding the far more ancient city of Nippur as the primary religious center of southern Mesopotamia.

After the fall of the first Babylonian Empire, the far south of Mesopotamia broke away for about 300 years, becoming the independent Akkadian-speaking Sealand Dynasty. Proto-Canaanite texts from northern Canaan and the Levant (modern Lebanon and Syria) around 1500 BC yield the first undisputed attestations of a written West Semitic language (although earlier testimonies are found in Mesopotamian annals concerning Amorite, and possibly preserved in Middle Bronze Age alphabets, such as the Proto-Sinaitic script from the late 19th century BC), followed by the much more extensive Ugaritic tablets of northern Syria from the late 14th century BC in the city-state of Ugarit in northwest Syria. Ugaritic was a West Semitic language, fairly closely related to, and part of the same general language family as the tongues of the Amorites, Canaanites, Phoenicians, Moabites, Edomites, Ammonites, Amalekites and Israelites. The appearance of nomadic Semitic-speaking Ahlamu, Arameans and Suteans in historical record also dates from the late 14th century BC, the Arameans coming to dominate an area roughly corresponding with modern Syria (which became known as Aram or Aramea), subsuming the earlier Amorites, and founding states such as Aram-Damascus, Luhuti, Bit Agusi, Hamath, Aram-Naharaim, Paddan-Aram, Aram-Rehob, Idlib and Zobah. The Suteans occupied the deserts of southeastern Syria and northeastern Jordan in the same period.

Between the 13th and 11th centuries BC, small Canaanite-speaking states arose in southern Canaan, an area approximately corresponding to modern Israel, Jordan, Palestine and the Sinai Peninsula. These were the lands of the Edomites, Moabites, Hebrews (Israelites/Judaeans/Samaritans), Ammonites, Ekronites, Suteans and Amalekites, all of whom spoke closely related west Semitic Canaanite languages. The Philistines are conjectured to have been one of the Sea Peoples, who arrived in southern Canaan sometime in the 12th century BC. In this theory, the Philistines would have spoken an Indo-European language, as there are possibly ancient Greek, Lydian, and Luwian traces in the limited information available about their tongue. However, there is no detailed information. An Indo-European Anatolian origin is also supported by Philistine pottery, which appears to have been the same as Mycenaean Greek pottery.

In the 19th century BCE, a similar wave of Canaanite speakers entered the Middle Kingdom of Egypt. By the early 17th century BCE, these Canaanites, whom the Egyptians called the Hyksos, had conquered the country, forming the Fifteenth Dynasty, introducing West Asian military technology new to Egypt such as the war chariot.

Egyptians spoke a language related to the Semitic family, the Egyptian language, which is likely equidistant between Semitic and Berber within the larger Afroasiatic language family. Other early Afroasiatic-speaking populations dwelt nearby in the Maghreb, the ancient Libyans (Putrians) of the northern Sahara, and the coasts of the Maghreb, as well as possibly to the southeast in the Land of Punt and in northern Sudan, which was previously inhabited by the A-Group, C-Group, and Kerma cultures.

== Iron Age ==
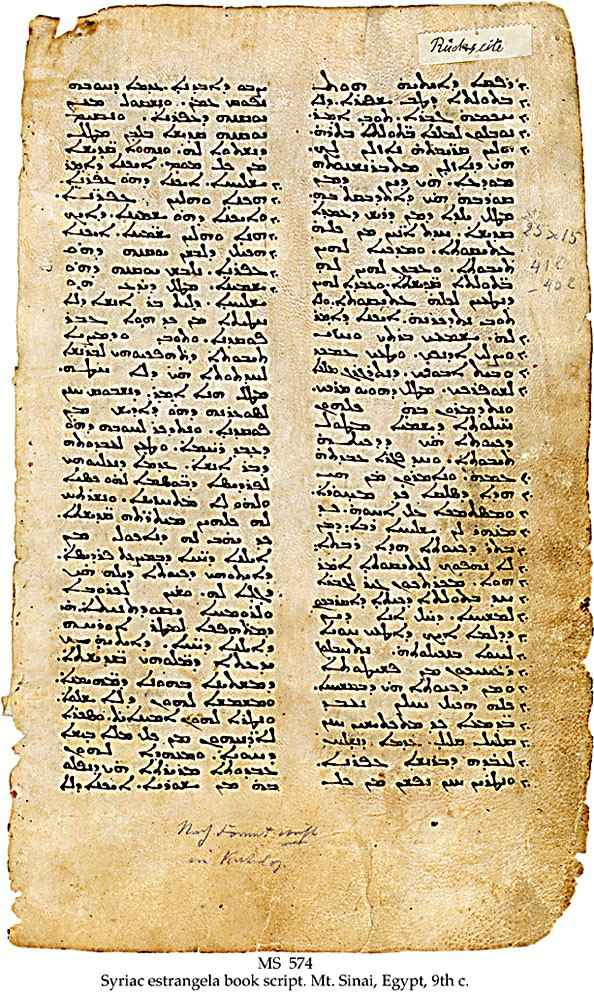
9th century Syriac manuscript

In the first millennium BC, the alphabet spread much further, giving us a picture not just of Canaanite, but also of Aramaic, Old South Arabian, and early Ge'ez. During this period, the case system, once vigorous in Ugaritic, seems to have started decaying in Northwest Semitic. Phoenician colonies (such as Carthage) spread their Canaanite language throughout much of the Mediterranean, while its close relative, Hebrew, became the vehicle of a religious literature, the Torah and Tanakh, which would have global ramifications. However, as an ironic result of the Assyrian Empire's vast conquests, Aramaic became the lingua franca of the Fertile Crescent and much of the Near East and parts of Anatolia, gradually pushing Akkadian, Hebrew, Phoenician-Canaanite, and several other languages to extinction, although Hebrew and Akkadian remained in use as sacred languages, Hebrew in particular developing a substantial literature. Ethiopian Semitic languages are first attested by the ninth century BC, with the earliest proto-Ge'ez inscriptions of the kingdom of Dʿmt using the South Arabian alphabet.

During the Middle Assyrian Empire (1366–1020 BC) and in particular the Neo-Assyrian Empire (911–605 BC) much of the Near East, Asia Minor, Caucasus, Eastern Mediterranean, Egypt, Ancient Iran and North Africa fell under Assyrian domination. During the eighth century BC, the Assyrian emperor Tiglath-Pileser III introduced Aramaic as the lingua franca of their empire and this language was to remain dominant among Near Eastern Semites until the early Middle Ages, and is in use as the mother tongue of the modern Assyrians and Mandaeans to the present day. In addition, the Syriac language and Syriac script emerged in Achaemenid Assyria during the 5th century BC, and this dialect of Eastern Aramaic was to have a major influence on the spread of Christianity and Gnosticism throughout the Near East from the 1st century AD onwards.

A Canaanite group known as the Phoenicians came to dominate the coasts of Syria, Lebanon and south west Turkey from the 13th century BC, founding city states such as Tyre, Sidon, Byblos, Simyra, Arwad, Berytus (Beirut), Antioch and Aradus, eventually spreading their influence throughout the Mediterranean, including building colonies in Malta, Sicily, Sardinia, the Iberian Peninsula and the coasts of North Africa, founding the major city state of Carthage (in modern Tunisia) in the 9th century BC. The Phoenicians created the Phoenician alphabet in the 12th century BC, which would eventually supersede cuneiform.

The first mentions of Chaldeans and Arabs appear in Assyrian records of the mid 9th century BC.

Phoenician became one of the most widely used writing systems, spread by Phoenician merchants across the Mediterranean world and beyond, where it evolved and was assimilated by many other cultures. The still extant Aramaic alphabet, a modified form of Phoenician script, was the ancestor of modern Hebrew, Syriac/Assyrian and Arab scripts, stylistic variants and descendants of the Aramaic script. The Greek alphabet (and by extension, its descendants such as the Latin, Cyrillic and Coptic alphabets), was a direct successor of Phoenician, though certain letter values were changed to represent vowels. Old Italic, Anatolian, Armenian, Georgian and Paleohispanic scripts are also descendant of Phoenician script.

A number of Semitic-speaking states are mentioned as existing in what was much later to become known as the Arabian Peninsula in Akkadian and Assyrian records as colonies of these Mesopotamian powers, such as Meluhha and Dilmun (in modern Bahrain). A number of other South Semitic states existed in the far south of the peninsula, such as Sheba/Saba (in modern Yemen), Magan and Ubar (both in modern Oman), although the histories of these states is sketchy (mainly coming from Mesopotamian and Egyptian records), as there was no written script in the region at this time. Later still, written evidence of Old South Arabian and Ge'ez (both related to but in reality separate languages from Arabic) offer the first written attestations of South Semitic languages in the 8th century BC in Sheba, Ubar and Magan (modern Oman and Yemen). These idioms, along with the Ge'ez script, were later imported to Ethiopia and Eritrea by migrating South Semites from South Arabia during the 8th and 7th centuries BC. Subsequent interaction with other Afroasiatic-speaking populations, Cushitic speakers who had settled in the area some centuries prior, gave rise to the present-day Ethiopian Semitic languages.

== Classical antiquity ==
After the fall of the Neo-Assyrian Empire (between 615 and 599 BC) and the succeeding short lived Neo-Babylonian Empire (615–539 BC) the Semitic speaking peoples lost control of the Near East to the Persian Achaemenid Empire (539–332 BC). However, the Persians had spent centuries under Assyrian domination and influence, and despite being Indo-European speakers, they retained the Imperial Aramaic of the Assyrian empire as the lingua franca of their own empire, and many of the Semitic nations of the region (such as Assyria, Babylonia, Israel, Judah, Aramea, Canaan and Phoenicia) continued to exist as geo-political entities, albeit as occupied satrapies of the Achaemenid Empire. In the satrapy of Assyria (Athura) the Imperial Aramaic language emerged during the 5th century BC.

The dominant position of Aramaic as the language of empire ended with the Greek Macedonian Empire (332–312 BC) and its succeeding Seleucid Empire (311–150 BC). After Alexander the Great conquered the Achaemenid Empire his successors introduced Greek as the official language. However, this did not impact on the spoken tongues of the Semitic peoples, who continued to be largely Aramaic speaking.

Both the Akkadian of the Assyrian and Babylonian Mesopotamians, and the Canaanite languages of the Israelites, Judeans, Samaritans, Edomites, Moabites, Ammonites and Phoenicians decreased steadily in the face of the adoption of Aramaic from the 8th century BC onwards, and by the early 1st millennium AD they had largely disappeared, although distinct forms of Hebrew remained in continuous literary and religious use among Jews and Samaritans, isolated use of Akkadian remained in Assyria and Babylonia between the 1st and 3rd centuries AD, Phoenician names are still attested until the 3rd century AD. and Coins from Phoenician cities still use Phoenician letters for short Phoenician city designations and names and Ulpian of Tyre and Jerome mention the use of the Phoenician language, the Punic dialect of Phoenician remained in use in the Carthaginian ruled parts of the Mediterranean at least until the 4th century AD. as indicated by Latino-Punic inscriptions from Tripolitania.

Aramaic, in the form of Late Eastern Aramaic, was the lingua franca of Assuristan (Persian-ruled Assyria and Babylonia), and the Neo-Assyrian states of Adiabene, Assur, Osroene, Beth Nuhadra, Beth Garmai and Hatra, extant between the 2nd century BC and 3rd century AD, and was to become the vehicle for the spread of Syriac Christianity throughout the entire Near East. Aramaic was also the language of the Aramean state of Palmyra and the short lived Palmyrene Empire.

== Later history ==
Aramaic dialects continued to be dominant among the peoples of what are today Iraq, Syria, Israel, Lebanon, Jordan, Palestinian territories, Kuwait, Sinai, south eastern Turkey, and parts of northwestern Iran and some areas the northern Arabian Peninsula, until the Arab Islamic conquest of the 7th century AD. After this, Arabic gradually replaced Aramaic as a part of a steady process of Arabization and Islamification, accompanied by the influx of a large number of Muslim Arabs from the Arabian Peninsula, although the Syriac language, script and literature continued to exert influence upon Arabic into the Middle Ages. Nevertheless, a number of Eastern Aramaic languages survive as the spoken languages of the Assyrians of northern Iraq, southeast Turkey, northeast Syria and northwest Iran, and of the Mandeans of Iraq and Iran, with somewhere between 575,000 and 1,000,000 fluent speakers in total. The Western Aramaic languages are now almost extinct, with only a few thousand speakers extant in and around Maaloula in western Syria.

Hebrew survived as the liturgical language of Judaism, before it was revived as a commonly spoken tongue in the 19th century.

== See also ==
- Ancient Semitic religion
- Genetic history of the Middle East
- Pan-Semitism
- Proto-Semitic language
- Afroasiatic homeland
- Semitic studies
