= Stele of Zakkur =

Ancient Aramaean stele

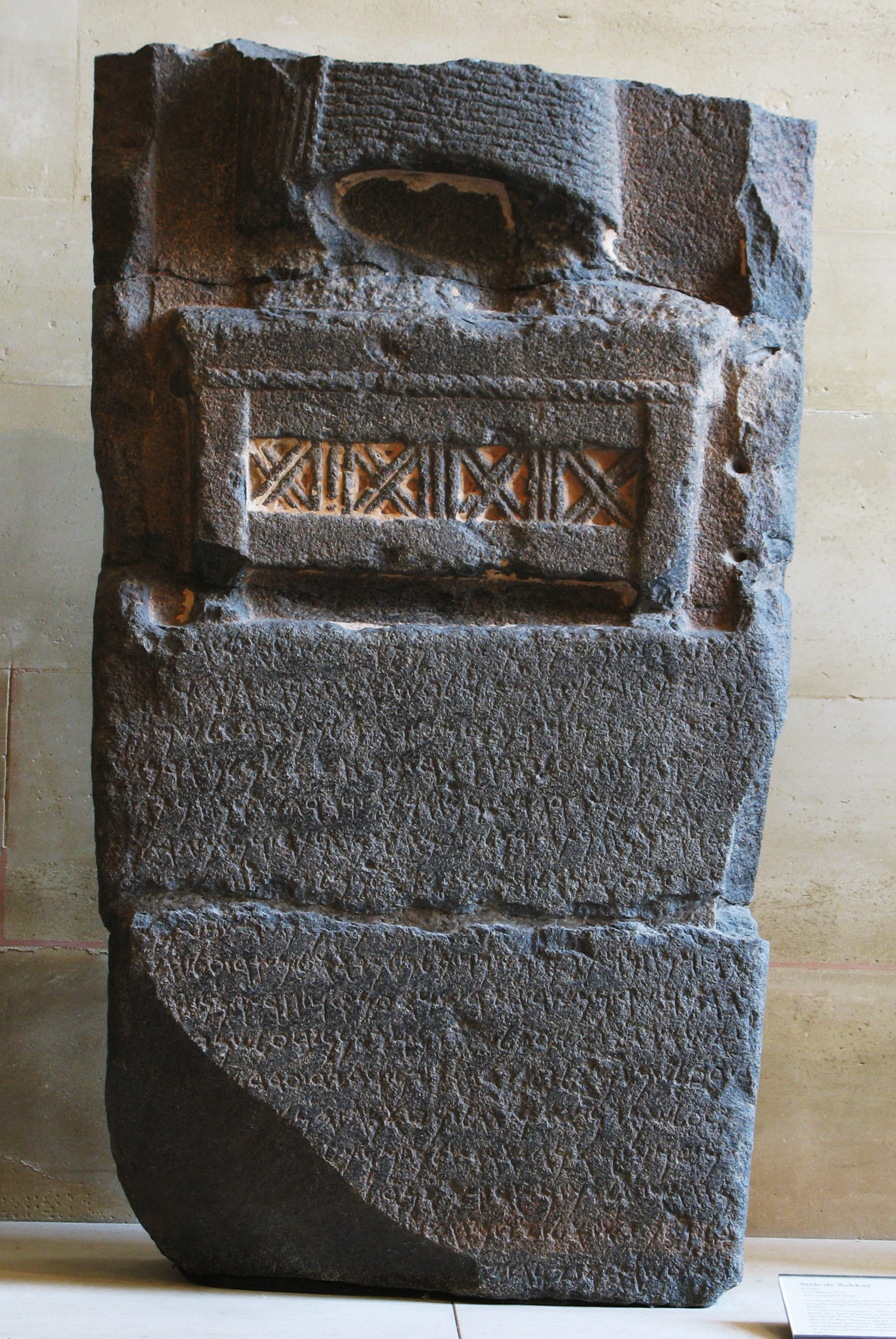
- The surviving part of the Stele of Zakkur with the inscription
- Material: Basalt
- Height: 62 centimetres (24 in)
- Width: 13 centimetres (5.1 in)
- Writing: Aramaic inscription
- Created: c. 805 BC – c. 775 BC
- Period/culture: Aramaean
- Discovered: 1903
- Place: Tell Afis, Syria
- Present location: Musée du Louvre, Paris
- Identification: AO 8185

The Stele of Zakkur (or Zakir) is a royal stele of King Zakkur of Hamath and Luhuti (or Lu'aš) in the province Nuhašše of Syria, who ruled around 785 BC.

== Description ==
The inscription was on the lower part of the original stele. The upper part is now missing; it probably had the statue of king Zakkur sitting on a chair. Only some small parts of the upper part are still preserved such as the feet.

== Discovery ==
The Stele was discovered in 1903 at Tell Afis, 45 km southeast of Aleppo, in the territory of the ancient kingdom of Hamath. It was published in 1907.

Tell Afis is referred to in the Stele as Hazrach. This place name is also mentioned in the Bible as Hadrach.

The long inscription is known as KAI 202; it reads, in part:

I am Zakkur, king of Hamath and Luash . . . Bar-Hadad, son of Hazael, king of Aram, united against me seventeen kings . . .all these kings laid siege to Hazrach . . . Baalshamayn said to me, "Do not be afraid! . . .I will save you from all [these kings who] have besieged you"

'Bar-Hadad' mentioned in the inscription may have been Bar-Hadad III, son of Hazael.

== Deities ==
Two gods are mentioned in the inscription, Baalshamin and Iluwer. Iluwer was the personal god of king Zakkur, while Baalshamin was the god of the city. It is believed that Iluwer represents the earlier god Mer or Wer going back to 3rd millennium BC.

This inscription represents the earliest Aramaean evidence of the god Baalshamin/Ba'alsamayin.

The Phoenician Yehimilk inscription, which also mentions Baalshamin, is even earlier. It dates to the 10th century BC.

== See also ==
- Baal with Thunderbolt
- List of artifacts significant to the Bible

== Bibliography ==
- Pognon, H., Inscriptions sémitiques de la Syrie, de la Mésopotamie, et de la région de Mossoul. Paris: Imprimerie nationale/Gabalda, 1907, 156–178.
- Driver, Samuel R., "An Aramaic Inscription from Syria." Expositor 7/5 (1908): 481–90.
- Ronzevalle, S., "An Aramaic inscription of Zakir, ruler of Hamath and Laˁš." Al-Mashriq 11 (1908): 302–10.
- Halévy, J., "Inscription de Zakir, roi de Hamat, découverte par M. H. Pognon." RevSém 16 (1908): 243–46.
- Nöldeke, Theodor, "Aramäische Inschriften." ZA 21 (1908): 375–88.
- Montgomery, James A., "Some Gleanings from Pognon's ZKR Inscription." JBL 28 (1909): 57–70.
- Barstad, Hans M., "The Prophet Oded and the Zakkur Inscription: A Case of Obscuriore Obscurum?" in: Exum, J. Cheryl, Williamson, Hugh G. M. (eds.), "Reading from Right to Left. Essays on the Hebrew Bible in Honour of David J.A. Clines," JSOT.S vol. 373. Sheffield 2003, 25–37.
- Sader, H., "Prophecy in Syria: Zakkur of Hamath and Luʿash," in: Rollston, Christopher A. (ed.), "Enemies and Friends of the State: Ancient Prophecy in Context," University Park/PA 2018, 115–134.
