= Semitic people (disambiguation) =

Semitic people, Semitic peoples or Semites may refer to

- the racial and ethnic concept of Semitic race, in common use between late 18th to early 20th century, now obsolete
- the archaeological and ancient history concept of Ancient Semitic-speaking peoples, describing those groups who left records of having written in Semitic languages
- The ethnolinguistic grouping of Semitic-speaking peoples
