= Atarshumki I =

King of Bit Agusi

Atarshumki I (also Bar-Guš, Atarsumki, Attar-sumkī) was the King of Bit Agusi in ancient Syria; he was the son of Arames (Hadram, Hadrame; Assyrian: Adramu, Arame). The capital of Bit Agusi at that time was Arpad.

== Reign ==
His father Hadram ruled from the city of Arne (Tell Aran), which is the largest archaeological mound in the Aleppo region of Syria. Arne was first inhabited by the Arameans, and served as the first royal capital of the Aramaean kingdom of Bit Agusi.

In 849 BC, Hadram joined an uprising against Assyria participating in an alliance with Sangara, the king of Carchemish, and other local rulers. But this was unsuccessful. After Arne's sacking by the Assyrian king Shalmaneser III, Arpad became the capital. "Arame son of Gûzi" is also mentioned in the Kurkh Monoliths.

Like his father, Atarshumki was rebellious against the Assyrian supremacy. At that time, Assyria was ruled by Shamshi-Adad V and then by Adad-nirari III.

Atarshumki tried to build a coalition with his neighbors against the Assyrians; finally, in 796, Adad-nirari III launched a military campaign in the area, and subjugated it.

=== The territorial conflict between Hamath and Arpad ===
The Antakya stele (de) is believed to belong to the later years of Adad-Nirari III. This is when the prominent official Shamshi-ilu, who is involved with the inscription, became active. Based on this, the inscription is believed to date in the 780s BC.

"The Antakya inscription describes the interference of the Assyrian King in a territorial conflict between Atarsumki, king of Arpad, and Zakkur, king of Hamath ... At that time, both kings were vassals of Adad-nirari III ... the settlement was established in favour of the previously hostile king of Arpad ... The reason for preferring Arpad is clear: it had broken up the lines of the Syro-Hittite coalition, and opened before Adad-nirari III the way to the south, to Damascus."

== Death ==
Following his death, he may have been succeeded by "Matti'el, son of Attarsamak", known from the Sefire stelas.

== See also ==
- Aram-Damascus
- List of Aramean kings
- List of Neo-Hittite kings

== Sources ==
- German Wikipedia

== Bibliography ==
- A. K. Grayson, In: The Cambridge Ancient History Vol. 3, 1, Cambridge 1982, p.272
- John David Hawkins, In: The Cambridge Ancient History Vol. 3, 1, Cambridge 1982, pp 400–408
- Nili Wazana: Water division in border agreements. In: State Archives of Assyria Bulletin 10, 1996, 55-66 PDF
