= Barga (kingdom) =

Former kingdom in the Near East

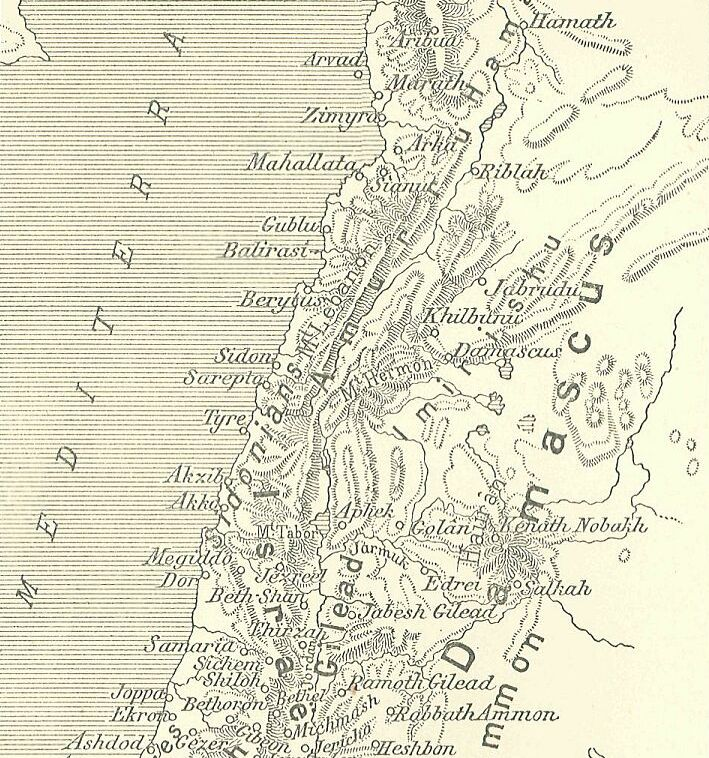

Barga was an ancient city and later petty kingdom in Syria during the Bronze age and Iron age.

== History ==
=== Early Bronze ===
The earliest mention of Bar-ga seems to be in the Ebla Archives during the EB IV.

=== Middle Bronze ===
In the Middle Bronze, Parga/Barga was a contested city between Yamhad and Qatna near Hamath.

=== Late Bronze ===
==== Mitanni period ====
The region fell under the Mitanni Empire, and the great king of Mitanni took the bordertown of Yaruwatta from Barga and gave it to Nuhasse. This would be the cause of a border dispute that would reappear in the Hittite period.

==== Amarna Archive ====
In Egypt, Barga was mentioned in the Amarna letters (c. 1350 BC).

In Amarna Letter EA 57, king Akizzi of Qatna makes reference to "the King of Barga". The text also mentions the city-state of Tunip. However, the text is very fragmented making it impossible to draw any conclusions about the location of Barga.

==== Hittite Period ====
After 1350 BC, the entire region west of Euphrates was conquered by Suppiluliuma I of Hatti.

During the reign of Mursili II of Hatti, a text (CTH 63) has Mursili II arbitrate in a border dispute between Nuḫašše and Barga, and it also included an agreement with Duppi-Teššup of Amurru. Barga and Nuḫašše disputed the dominion of the city Yaruqatta (URU i-ia-ru-wata-an/aš).

It is mentioned as the "land of Barga" by Mursilis II in treaties, (see Habiru).

- King Abiradda of Barga, a vassal of Mursili II.
- DU-Tesub, son of Abiradda.

== Theories ==
The location of Barga is uncertain.

=== West of Nuhasse ===
Some have suggested that it was southwest of Aleppo, west of Nuhasse, near the Syrian Coastal Mountain Range

=== East of Nuhasse ===
However, it is possible that Barga was east of Nuhasse. Nuhasse was succeeded by the Iron Age state of Lu'ash, centered on Tell Afis which may be used as a point of reference. Nuhasse bordered directly or indirectly Aleppo in the north, Mukish/Alalakh in the northwest, Niya in the east, Ugarit even further east beyond the mountains, Amurru in the southeast, Kadesh in the south, Qatna in the southwest. Thus, Barga may have been east of Nuhasse, north of Qatna, and southeast of Aleppo. If Aleppo/Yamhad and Qatna disputed over Barga in the MBA, then this further adds to a realm east of the city-state of Ebla which was absorbed by Yamhad.

Short list of plausible candidates:

- Tell Tuqan / Tell Touqan — a large tell (c. ~26 ha) immediately east of Tell Afis in the Matkh/Jazr plain; excavated and attested from EB–MB onward, a site directly east of Afis.
- Tell Umm el-Marra — the largest Bronze-Age tell on the Jabbul Plain (c. 20–25 ha), east / ESE of Aleppo; long Bronze Age occupation and regional role (often equated with ancient Tuba). Its position fits the “SE of Aleppo / north of the Homs–Qatna area” sector.
- Tell Aran (ancient Arne) — a very large, high tell southeast of Aleppo (major Iron-Age / Bronze remnant); regionally important and visible in the same landscape, though usually identified with Arne/Bit-Agusi rather than Barga.

== See also ==
- Amarna letters
- Habiru
- Nuhašše, Niya (kingdom), relative kingdoms
- Akizzi, Prince of Qatna
- Amarna letters–localities and their rulers
