= Hadrach =

Iblical name, denoting a place, a king or a deity

Hadrach (Hebrew: חַדְרָךְ) is a Biblical name, denoting a place, a king or a deity revered on the boundaries of Damascus. It is only mentioned once in the Bible, at Zechariah 9:1. It is generally thought to have been situated north of Lebanon.

Writing in 1890, T. T. Perowne states that until "recently", Hadrach had caused

much perplexity to commentators. Some of them explained it to be the name of a king, others of an idol, while others regarded it as a symbolical name composed by the prophet. The question, however, as to the meaning of the word appears to have been satisfactorily set at rest, by its being discovered in the Assyrian inscriptions "in the catalogue of Syrian cities tributary to Nineveh". Sir H. Rawlinson, quoted by Pusey, says, "It is now certain that there was a city called Hadrach in the neighbourhood of Damascus and Hamath, although its exact site is not known … In the Assyrian Canon[,] Hadrach is the object of three Assyrian expeditions."

According to George L. Klein, Hadrach has been identified with the Assyrian place-name Hatarikka, or Aramean Hazrik, (the capital of Luhuti) possibly located at Tell Afis. It is also mentioned as Hazrach in the Zakkur Stele.

== See also ==
- List of biblical names starting with H
- Luhuti
- Tell Afis

== Sources ==
- Singer, Isidore; et al., eds. (1901–1906). "HADRACH". The Jewish Encyclopedia. New York: Funk & Wagnalls.
- s:Encyclopaedia Biblica/Gothoniel-Haggi#HADRACH
