= Wer (god) =

Mesopotamian weather god

- Weather god
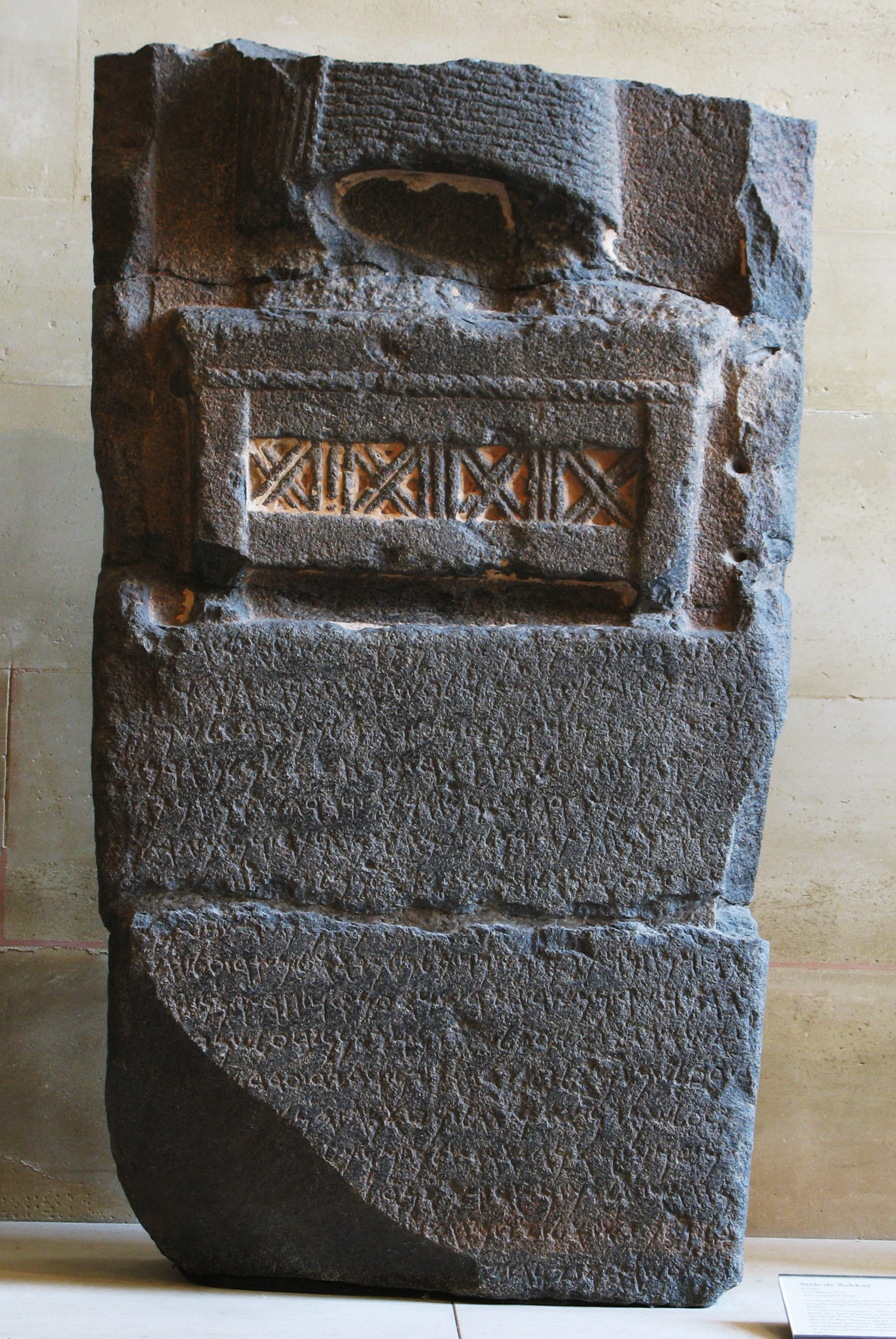
- Stele of Zakkur, with an inscription mentioning Iluwer, a variant of Wer's name.
- Major cult center: Terqa, Assur, Tell Afis
- Consort: Wertum

Wer (Wēr), also known as Mer, Ber and Iluwer was a weather god worshiped in parts of Mesopotamia and ancient Syria. It is presumed that he was originally one of the main deities of the northern parts of these areas, but his cult declined in the second half of the second millennium BCE. The nature of the relation between him and Itūr-Mēr, the tutelary god of Mari, is disputed by researchers.

In an Old Babylonian version of the Epic of Gilgamesh, Wer is described as the master of the monster Humbaba, though in other versions of this narrative this role instead belongs to Enlil.

== Name ==
Two forms of the name, Wēr and Mēr, were originally in use. A third version, Bēr, started to be commonly used in the Middle Assyrian period. Additionally, god lists attest the form Iluwēr, "the god Wēr." The spelling Mēr was consistently employed in texts from Mari and nearby areas, with the chronologically most recent example being the theophoric name Tukulti-Mēr (a contemporary of Ashur-bel-kala) from the late second millennium BCE, while Wer (Wēr) was the form used in southern Mesopotamia between the beginning of the period of the Third Dynasty of Ur end of the reign of the First Dynasty of Babylon, as well as in Old Assyrian sources contemporary with the texts from Kanesh. Bēr predominates only in Middle Assyrian and Neo-Assyrian texts. Whether ^{d}ME-RU, possibly to be read as Meru, attested in sources from the Early Dynastic period (including the Abu Salabikh god list) is the same deity as Wer is uncertain.

While multiple Sumerian etymologies have been proposed for the name (including derivation from the terms IM-mer, "north wind;" me-er-me-er, "storm;" and emesal me-er, "wind"), none have been conclusively proven. Wilfred G. Lambert concluded that the name might have originated in a linguistic substrate due to the first consonant not following the usual phonetic rules of known languages of the region(suggesting unknown language lost through time). Whether a connection existed between the theonym Wer/Mer and place names such as Mari and Warum is uncertain too. Lambert considered the similarity to be accidental in the case of Mari, though he concluded that the matter cannot be conclusively settled.

== Character ==
Wer was a weather god. According to Wilfred G. Lambert, available sources might indicate that he was originally one of the main gods worshiped in northern Mesopotamia, but eventually declined in the middle of the second millennium BCE due to loss of his cult sites.

Wer's symbol was a lance. A single Old Babylonian text attests that not only Wer himself, but also a deification of his emblem, ^{d}Šu-ku-ru-um ("lance"), could be an object of worship.

While god lists, starting with An = Anum, could consider Wer analogous to Ishkur/Adad, his own name was never represented by the logogram^{d}IŠKUR, unlike these of other storm gods, such as Hurrian Teshub, Hattian Taru, Hittite Tarḫunna, or Luwian Tarḫunz.

== Other related theonyms ==
The feminine form of the name, Wertum (or Mertum) likely designated the wife of Wer. She is attested in Assur in the Old Assyrian period (where one of the city gates was named after her) and in a theophoric name from Mari.

A number of Assyriologists, including Dietz Otto Edzard, Wilfred G. Lambert and Andrew R. George, assume that Wer was the same deity as Itūr-Mēr, the tutelary god of Mari, but this view is regarded as unsubstantiated by Daniel Schwemer and Ichiro Nakata, who point out that the latter deity's name is an ordinary theophoric name ("Mēr has turned [to me]") and that for this reason he is more likely to be a deified hero venerated as part of an ancestor cult tied to a specific location. Known texts additionally do not indicate that he was a weather deity like Wer. Other deities who are most likely deified heroes or kings in origin are attested from Mari, for example Yakrub-El. A second deity worshiped in Mari whose name is structured similarly and also includes Wer as the theophoric element is Tar’am-Mēr, "beloved of Mēr (Wer)".

While known copies of a single passage from the incantation series Šurpu alternate between Wer and a deity named Immeriya, it cannot be established if the latter, who is otherwise best known from an inscribed statue possibly taken as bounty by Untash-Napirisha, was related to him in any way.

== Worship ==
Worship of Wer is chiefly attested from the middle Euphrates area, northern Babylonia (though only before the Middle Babylonian period), the Diyala area, and Assyria. While confirmed attestations go back to the time of the Akkadian Empire, only from the Old Babylonian period onward the god is known from sources other than theophoric names.

Wer appears in nine types of masculine theophoric names from Old Babylonian Mari, with eight using the spelling Mer and one - Wer. Furthermore, the names of the local deities Itūr-Mēr and Tar’am-Mēr are both agreed to be theophoric names invoking him. Other sites where names invoking him are attested include Sippar, various locations in Assyria (in the Old Assyrian period) and the Diyala area, Puzrish-Dagan (Puzur-Wer from the Ur III period) and Larsa (Ubār-Wēr from the Old Babylonian period). A possible seventh century BCE attestation of a theophoric name invoking him as Ber, dnbr, usually interpreted as Dannu-Ber, "Ber is strong," is known from an Aramaic papyrus found in Saqqara in Egypt, However, the restoration is not certain, and according to Daniel Schwemer caution should be maintained.

References to veneration of Wer other than theophoric names are absent from the corpus of Mari texts, though a place named Bāb-Mēr (KÁ-me-er^{ki}) is attested in a single source from the šakkanakku period. Furthermore, later texts from the kingdom of Ḫana attest the existence of a house of worship dedicated to him (akīt ^{d}me-er) in nearby Terqa. He was also apparently worshiped in Nerebtum, Shaduppum and Kakkulatum.

A school text from Kanesh, an Assyrian trading colony in Anatolia, mentions him alongside Ashur. In the Neo-Assyrian period, he was worshiped in Assur in the temple of Ištar-Aššurītu ("the Assyrian Ishtar"), and in Nineveh in the temple of Ashur. He is also mentioned on the Antakya stele of Adad-nirari III alongside Ashur, Adad, Sin of Harran and other deities. Additionally, in the same period Iluwēr, most likely the same deity, was worshiped by Arameans in Tell Afis in Syria, as attested on the Stele of Zakkur.

== Mythology ==
In a section of an Old Babylonian version of the Epic of Gilgamesh preserved on the so-called "Yale tablet," corresponding to tablet III of the standard version, Enkidu mentions that the cedar mountain to which Gilgamesh wants to venture is under the control of the god Wer, described as "mighty" and "never sleeping," and as the one who appointed the monster Humbaba as its guardian. Adad is also associated with Wer in the same passage.

In other versions of the Epic of Gilgamesh, Humbaba's master is Enlil. Even on the Yale tablet, it is mentioned that he bestowed seven terrors upon him. Andrew R. George assumes that while the mountain belongs to Wer, and he appointed Humbaba as its guardian and his second in command, the decision still had to be approved by Enlil.
