= Ubar =

Ubar may refer to:

- Ab Bar
- A legendary land in southern Arabia, often referred to as Atlantis of the Sands, which is considered by some to be the same as:
  - Iram of the Pillars
  - Archaeological site of Shisr
- The Wabar or Ubar craters, near the lost Arabian city
- U bar, a letter of the Latin alphabet, that's formed from U with the addition of a bar: Ʉ, ʉ.
- μbar, a unit of pressure
