= Bit Agusi =

Iron Age kingdom in the northern Levant

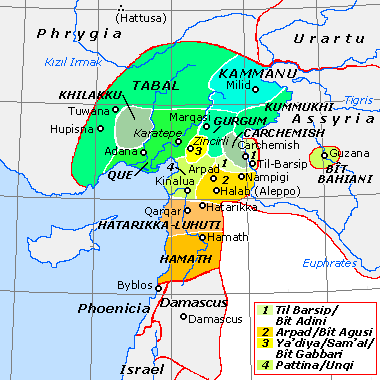
Historical map of the Neo-Hittite states, c. 800 BC with approximate border lines

Bit Agusi or Bit Agushi (also written Bet Agus) was an ancient Neo-Hittite state of the Arameans in the northern Levant during the Iron Age. The state-kingdom of Bit Agusi was established in the early 9th century BC by Gusi of Yakhan. Bit Agusi included the cities of Nampigi (Nampigu), Arpad in modern Syria, and, in its later history, Aleppo. Arpad was its capital. At its maximum extent, the state-kingdom of Bit Agusi covered the A'zaz area in the north to Hamath in the south.

== Chronology ==
Scholars divide Bit Agusi history in Northern Syria in the ninth and eighth centuries BC into seven stages.

- Stage 1 (858–ca. 842 BC). Early Bit Agusi is apparently free of political alliances with neighbors. Arame, the second king of Bit Agusi, submits to Assyria freely in 858 BCE, as do many other rulers of the region, including those of southern Anatolia.
- Stage 2 (841–823 BC). Bit Agusi is subjugated to Assyria.
- Stage 3. (c. 823 BC). Bit Agusi leads a local alliance opposing Assyrian hegemony and achieves independence.
- Stage 4. Aram-Damascus gains supremacy in the region; this lasts until approximately 805 BC. King Hazael of Aram-Damascus is prominent.
- Stage 5 (ca. 800–754 BC). The Kingdom of Hamath-and-Luash arise in the south, while Urartu becomes prominent in the north. Assyria is weakened.
- Stage 6 (754–744 BC). Bit Agusi, now known as the Kingdom of Arpad, rises to prominence. It likely controls Hamath or is in a close confederation with it. The Sefire treaty between Mati-ilu, son of Attarsumki the King of Arpad, and a figure called "Bar-Gayah, King of KTK" is concluded.
- Stage 7 (743–740 BC). Bit Agusi is reduced to the status of an Assyrian province.

The identity of "Bar-Gayah, King of KTK" is not entirely clear. The land and of "KTK" may have been the large confederation known at the time as "All Aram".

Bar-Ga’yah may have been the "King of KTK" and an Assyrian ruler who was not the official king but a powerful royal co-regent. This co-regent would have, after 856 BC, been based at Til Barsip, which by then had become the military capital of the Assyrian kingdom of Bit Adini. Mati’-El (Mati-ilu) was a vassal of Bar-Ga'yah, who was more powerful than the king of Arpad.

== Decline and fall ==
Arpad later became a major vassal city of the Kingdom of Urartu. In 743 BC, during the Urartu-Assyria War, the Neo-Assyrian king Tiglath-Pileser III laid siege to Arpad following the defeat of the Urartian army of Sarduri II at Samsat. But the city of Arpad did not surrender easily. It took Tiglath-Pileser three years of siege to conquer Arpad, whereupon he massacred its inhabitants and destroyed the city. Afterward Arpad served a provincial capital. A coalition of princes which had been allied to the city was also defeated, including the kings of Kummuh, Quwê, Carchemish and Gurgum. Bit Agusi was never repopulated. The remains of Arpad's walls are still preserved in Tell Rifaat to the height of 8 meters.

== See also ==
- Atarshumki I of Bit agusi
- List of Neo-Hittite kings
