= Tell Afis =

Syrian archaeological site

Coordinates: 35°54′18″N 36°47′55″E

- تل آفس (Arabic)
- Hazrek
- Location within Syria
- Type: settlement
- Location: Idlib Governorate, Syria

Site notes
- Area: 28 ha (69 acres)
- Excavation dates: 1986–2010
- Archaeologists: Stefania Mazzoni and Serena Maria Cecchini
- Condition: ruins

Tell Afis is an archaeological site in the Idlib Governorate of northern Syria, lying about fifty kilometers southeast of Aleppo and 11 kilometers north of the ancient site of Ebla. The site is thought to be that of ancient Hazrek (under Neo-Assyrians - Hatarikka) capital of the Kingdom of Hamath and Luhuti. The Stele of Zakkur (KAI 202), dated c, 785 BC, which contains a dedication in Aramaic to the gods Iluwer and Baalshamin, was discovered at the top of the acropolis in 1903 by the French Consul Henri Pognon. It is now in the Louvre Museum. The city is referred to in the Zakkur Stele as Hazrach, and in the Bible as Hadrach (Zechariah 9).

== History ==
Occupation of the site extends from the Late Chalcolithic, Ubaid period, Early Bronze I period, Middle Bronze II, until the Iron Age.

=== Late Chalcolithic ===
In the Late Chalcolithic (4000-3200 BC) it was surrounded by a megalithic stone wall at the base of the acropolis with a moat. The economy was based on the herding of mostly sheep but also pigs. The find of elderly bovines indicated that agriculture was being practices.

=== Early Bronze Age ===
During the Early Bronze Age (2500-2000 BC) occupation was mainly of a domestic nature though an industrial area (pottery manufacture) was found to the north and a food processing area to the south.

=== Middle Bronze Age ===
==== Yamhad Period ====
In the Middle Bronze IIA (c. 1820-1628 BC), the Kingdom of Yamhad (Aleppo) gained control of the region and Ebla to the south became a vassalage. Afis being north of Ebla on the route to Aleppo would have been part of this change.

In the lower town Middle Bronze Age II occupation is attested (excavation Area D) but in a smaller area than the later Iron Age II-III Aramaean town, as well as on the acropolis. Both the lower town and acropolis were walled, with the latter substantial and laid on massive stone foundations. A number of radiocarbon samples from a kiln in the EB-MB layer were tested. In the Middle Bronze I/II layer of excavation E on the acropolis an Old Syrian Linear Style green stone seal was found, dating to the 1st half of the 2nd millennium BC.

=== Late Bronze Age ===
==== Mitanni Period ====
In the 15th century BC, the Mitanni Empire gained control over the region. Afis may have belonged to a petty kingdom called Nuhasse.

==== Hittite Period ====
Around 1350-1345 BC, the Hittite ruler Suppiluliuma I gained control over the northern parts of Syria. This region was then called Nuhasse. Levels VII to V have been firmly dated to the time of control by 13th century BC Hittite ruler Hattusili III by seals, pottery, and nine cuneiform tablets and fragments (in Building F). Two of the tablets, and a fragment, were in Hittite while the others, badly damaged, were administrative documents in local clay.

=== Iron Age ===
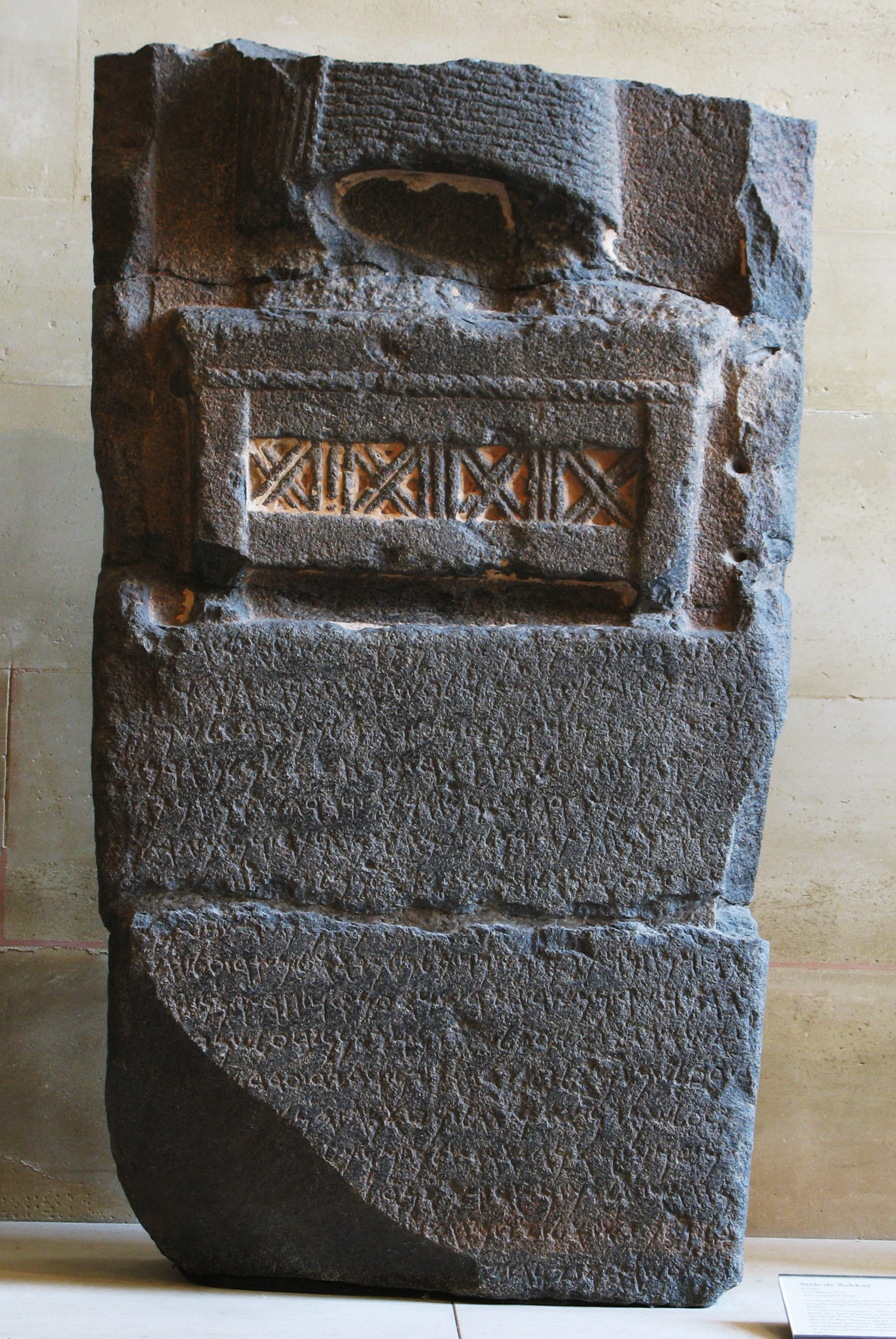
Zakkur Stele 0154

In Iron Age I (1100-950 BC) the site was a small settlement.

In Iron Age II (950-750 BC) Tell Afis grew to substantial size and was part of the Kingdom of Hamath. On the western side of the Acropolis a multiperiod temple was found. The two lowest levels (A3.2 followed by A3.1) date from Iron Age I, both of mudbrick with the same plan and a 2.5 meter wide gate to the south. In A3.1 a plastered central podium was found with pit of ashes which included animal bones and fragments of a painted keros jar. A cylinder seal depicting a storm god was also found. The earlier temples were leveled when the Iron Age II-III temples, A2 followed by A1, were constructed. They were of a tripartite longroom design 38 meters by 32 meters with a vestibule, a long hall, a rear room, and rooms along the sides and constructed of stone.Temple A1 was dismantled and the materials re-used. A sizable Iron Age II cultic area was discovered to the east of Temple A2, on the eastern acropolis. In Building G, 25 meters to the east of the sacred area, a pottery shard marked "LWR" was found. It was speculated that they were three letters of the god of Hazrek El-we. Three additional Aramaic fragments were later found. In Iron Age III (750/700-600 BC) the site was occupied c. 738 BC by the Neo-Assyrian empire under Tiglath-Pileser III. In 720 BC Sargon II defeated the Kingdom of Hamath.

== Archaeology ==
The tell is 28 hectares in area (570 meters by 500 meters) with an extensive lower city and an acropolis on the northern edge. The site had been subject to quarrying by the local populace for building materials. The lower town was protected by a Late Iron Age 5.2 meter wide wall. The wall was built without foundation or facing which the excavators took to indicate it was built rapidly. In 1932 William F. Albright collected Iron Age pottery in a surface collection. In 1970, 1972, and 1978 excavations were conducted by Paolo Matthiae with the Italian Archaeological Mission in Syria. The site was excavated from 1986 until 2010 by a joint project from the universities of Rome, Pisa and Bologna, under the direction of Stefania Mazzoni and Serena Maria Cecchini. Two areas (B and D) were excavated in the northern part of the lower town. On the acropolis, areas A, G, and, E (on the western slope) were excavated. Ubaid period finds included Coba bowls.

The site was reportedly damaged by encampments during the Syrian civil war.

== See also ==
- Cities of the ancient Near East
