= Sefire steles =

Aramaic inscriptions

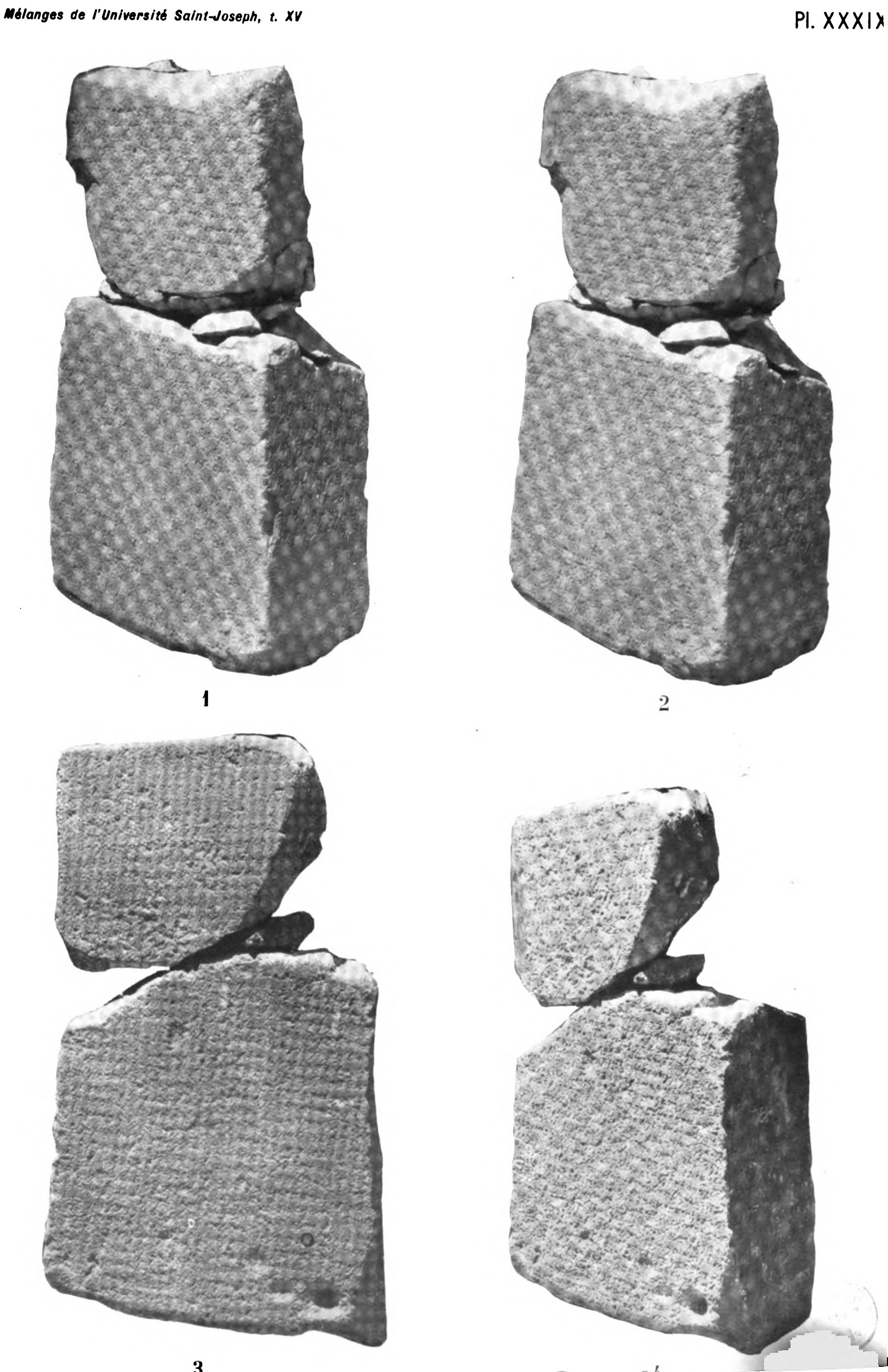
Sébastien Ronzevalle's 1930 publication of the Sefire I and Sefire II, each shown at two different angles

The Sfire or Sefire steles are three 8th-century BCE basalt stelae containing Aramaic inscriptions discovered near As-Safira ("Sfire") near Aleppo, Syria.

The Sefire treaty inscriptions are the three inscriptions on the steles; they are known as KAI 222-224. A fourth stele, possibly from Sfire, is known as KAI 227 (the "Starcky Tablet", at the Louvre).

== Discovery of the inscriptions ==
=== Sefire I ===
Discovered in 1930, it is held in the National Museum of Damascus. This is a basalt slab broken in two horizontally. The first two steles each have three faces bearing writing.

=== Sefire II ===
Discovered in 1930, it is held in the National Museum of Damascus. As with Sefire I stele, Sefire II had three faces bearing writing. While most of the text of Sefire II A and B permit coherent translation only with comparison with Sefire I and III, the concluding portion of Sefire II A and B is quite clear.

=== Sefire III ===
Discovered in 1956, Sefire III is made up of nine fragments of the reverse of a broad slab. It is held by the Beirut National Museum.

== The inscriptions ==
The inscriptions record two treaties that "list curses and magical rites which take effect if the treaty is violated".

One is a treaty between two minor kings, Barga'yah and Matti'el, who hailed from the southwestern periphery of the Assyrian empire. In the text, Matti'el swears to accept dire consequences for himself and his cities should he violate the stipulations of the treaty:

"....
As this wax is consumed by fire, thus Ma[tti'el] shall be consumed b[y fi]re.
As this bow and these arrows are broken, thus Inurta and Hadad (= names of local deities) shall break [the bow of Matti'el] and the bows of his nobles.
As a man of wax is blinded, thus Matti'el shall be blinded.
[As] this calf is cut up, thus Matti'el and his nobles shall be cut up."

This loyalty oath from the Sefire inscriptions is similar to other loyalty oaths imposed by Assyrian kings on other less powerful monarchs in the Levant throughout the 8th and 7th centuries BCE.

The inscriptions may, under one possible interpretation, record the names of El and Elyon, "God, God Most High" possibly providing prima facie evidence for a distinction between the two deities first worshipped by the Jebusites in Jerusalem, and then elsewhere throughout the ancient Levant.

Thought to be reflective of Assyrian or neo-Assyrian culture and similar to other documents dating from the first millennium BCE, scholars such as Joseph Fitzmyer have perceived Canaanite influences in the text, while Dennis McCarthy has noted similarities to second millennium BCE treaties imposed by Hittite kings on Syrian vassals.

=== Identification of the treaty kings ===
Two treaties conducted between minor kings from the Kingdom of Arpad inscribed on the stelae are often cited as evidence of the Aramaean tradition of treaty-making. The Sefire inscriptions are of interest to those studying beliefs and practices in ancient Syria and Palestine and the text is considered notable for constituting "the best extrabiblical source for West Semitic traditions of covenantal blessings and curses."

They tell of "The treaty of King Bar-ga'yah of K[a]t[a]k, with Mati'el son of Attarsamak, king of Arpad." Some have identified this as the treaty of "Ashurnerari V" (Adad-nirari III or his son Tiglath-pileser III?) of Assyria and Matiilu (unknown) of Arpad (probably modern Tel Rifaat, Syria).

== Gallery ==
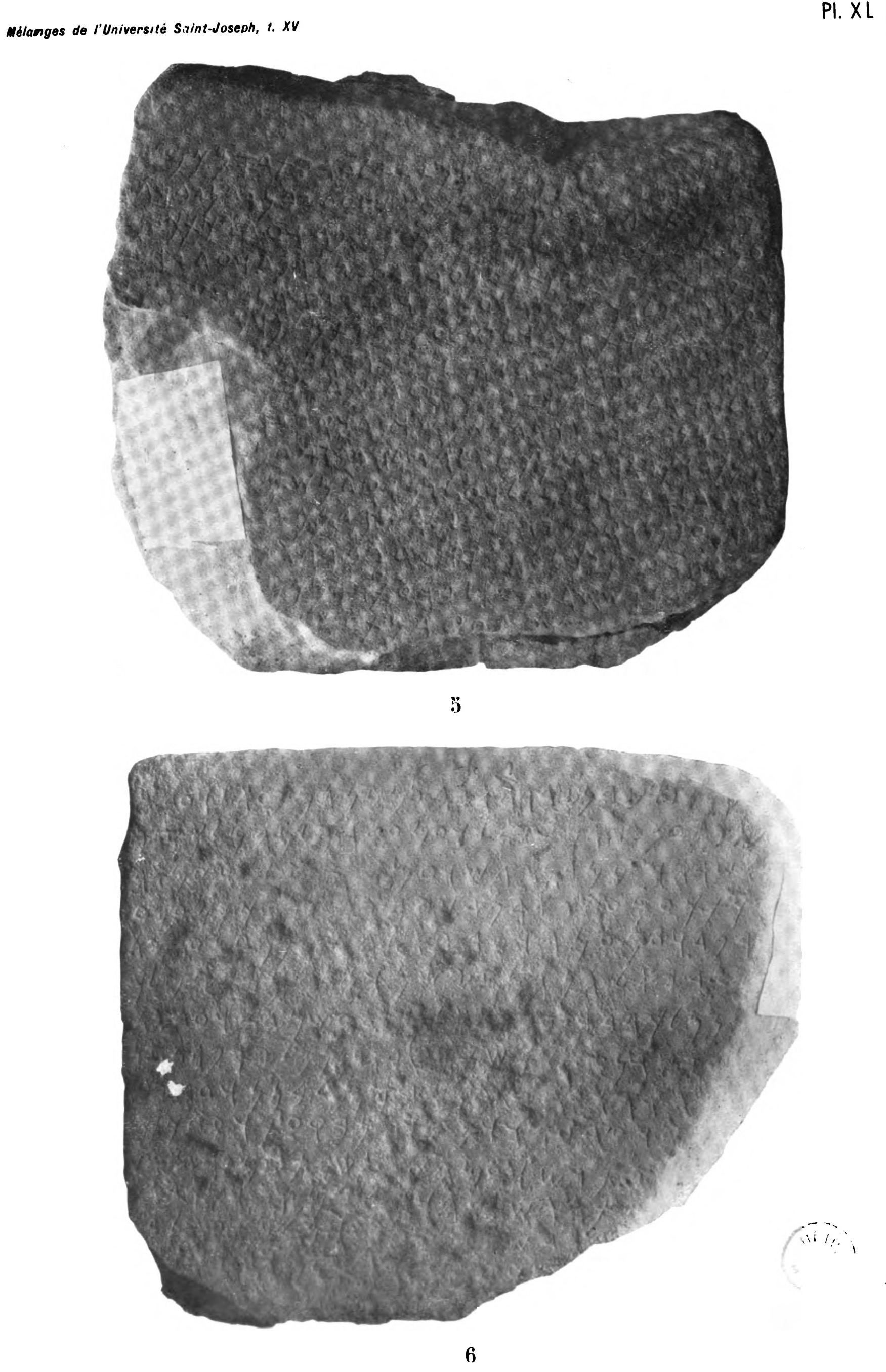

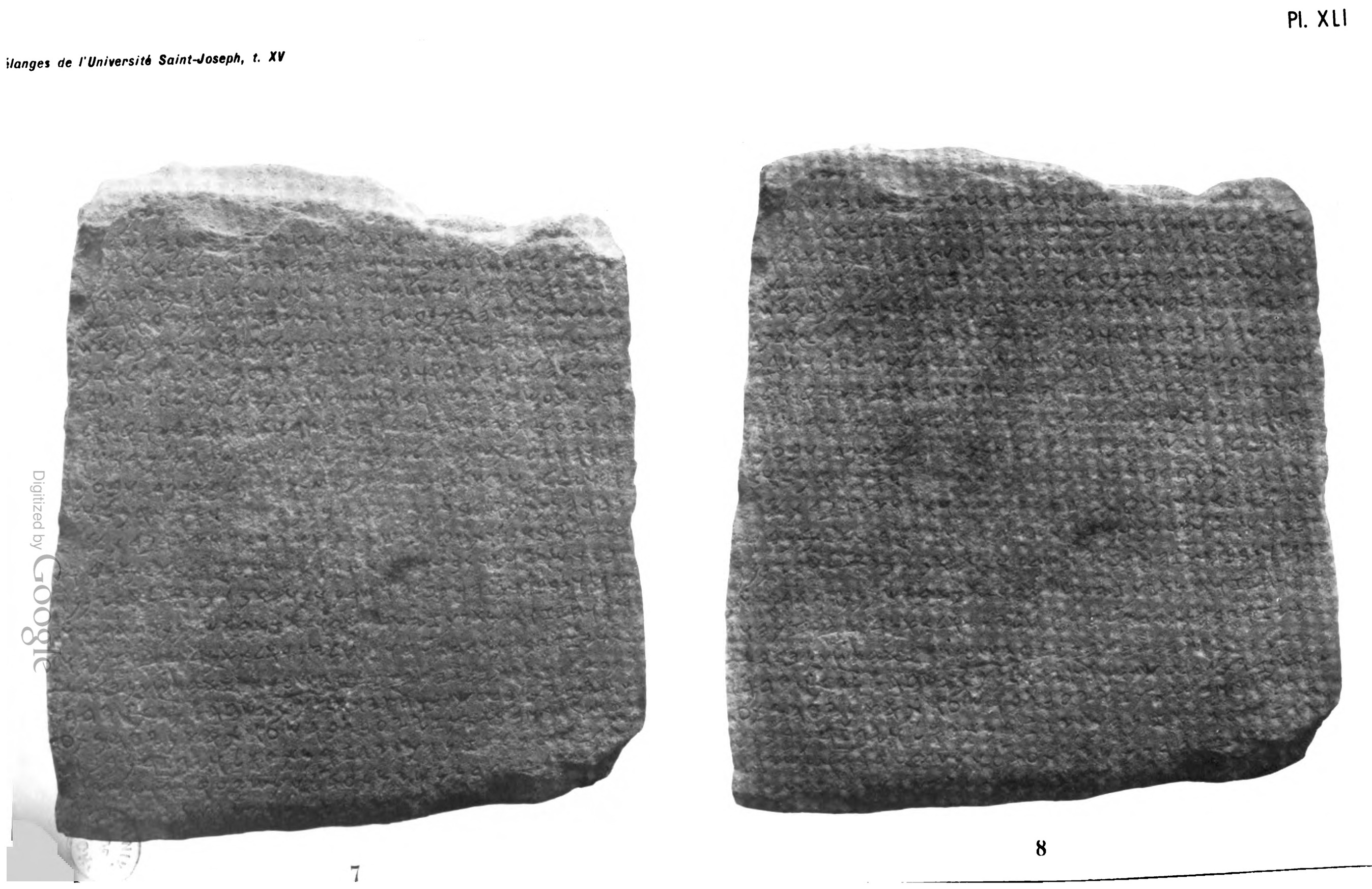

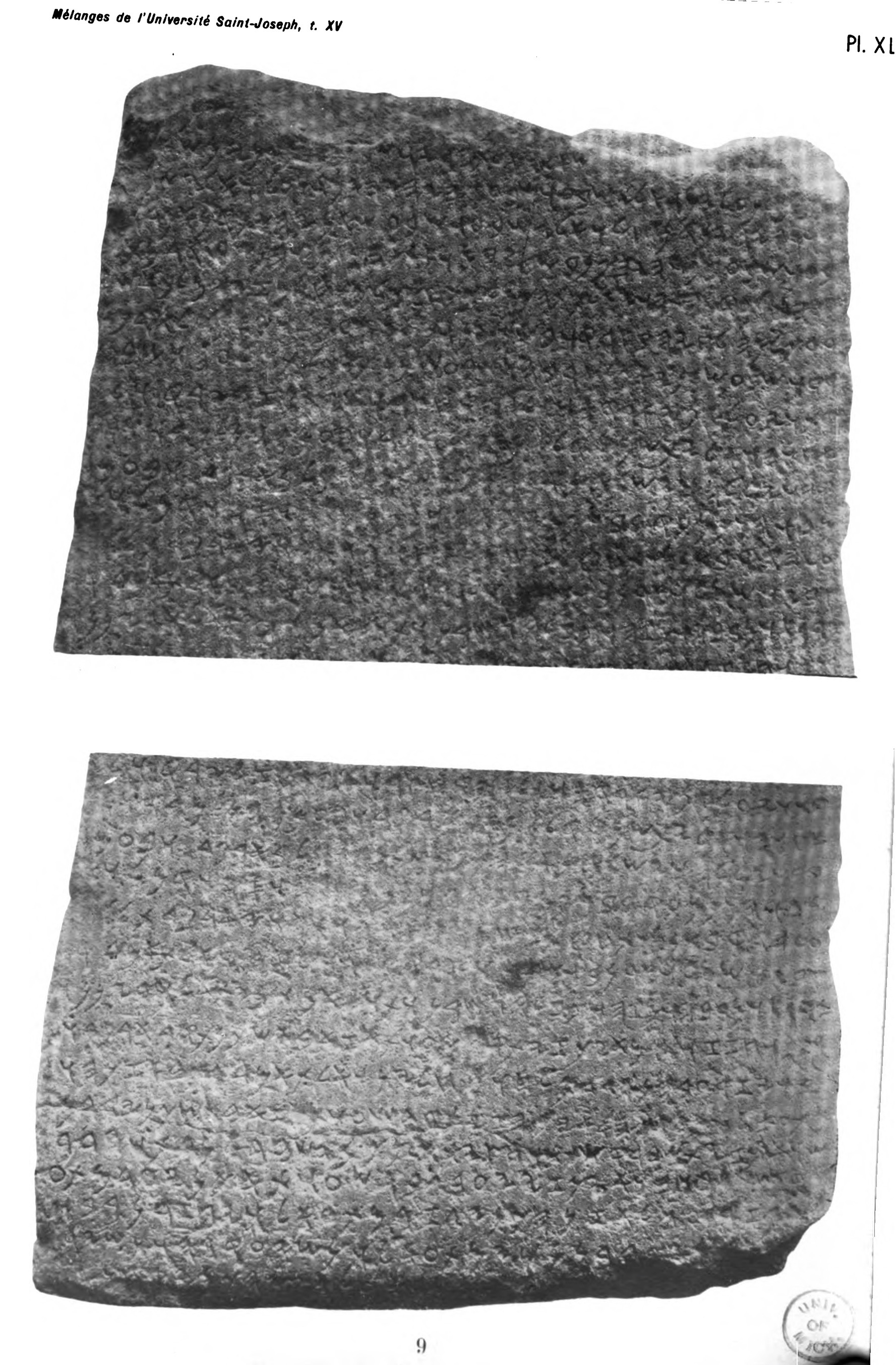

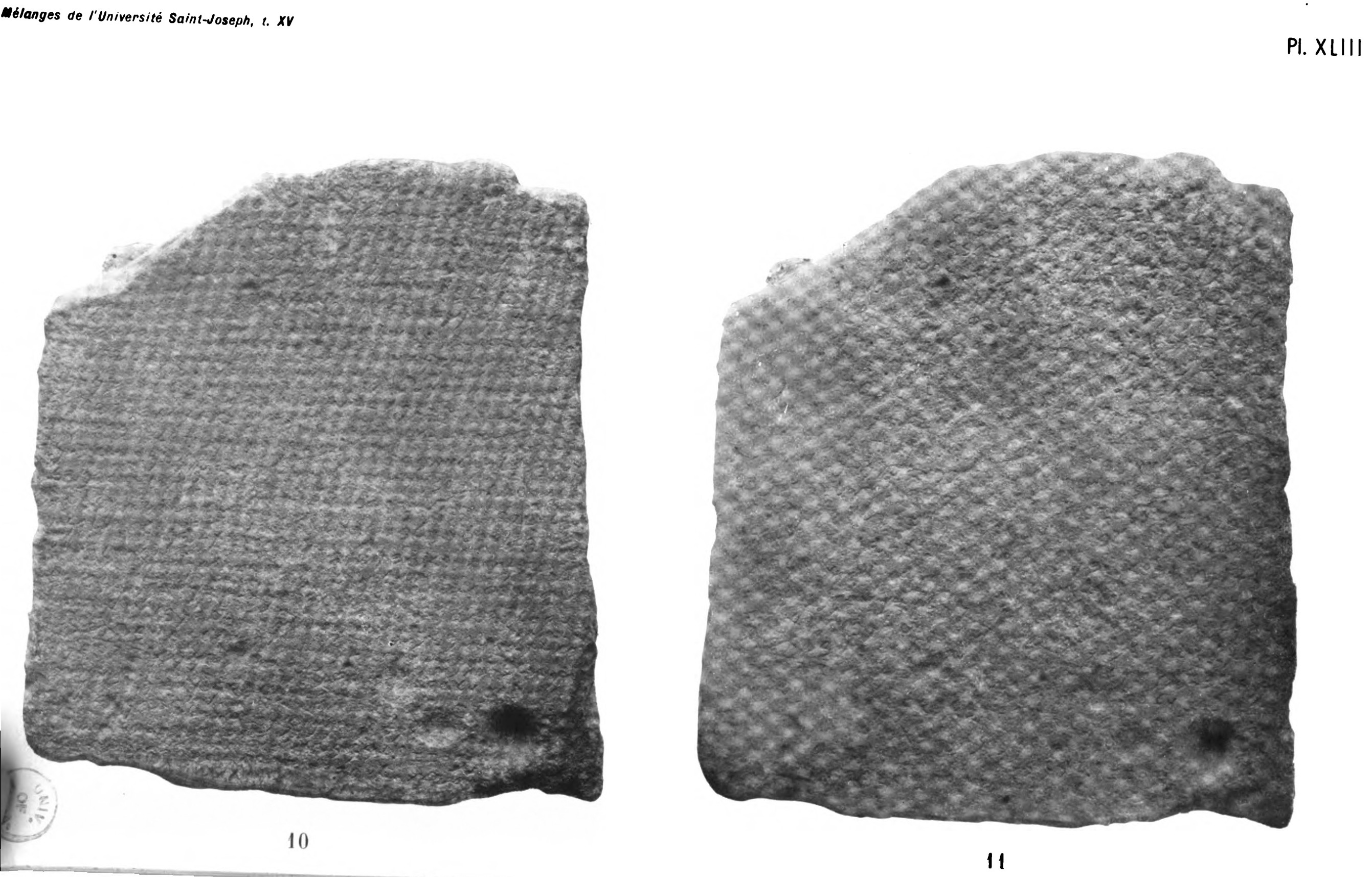

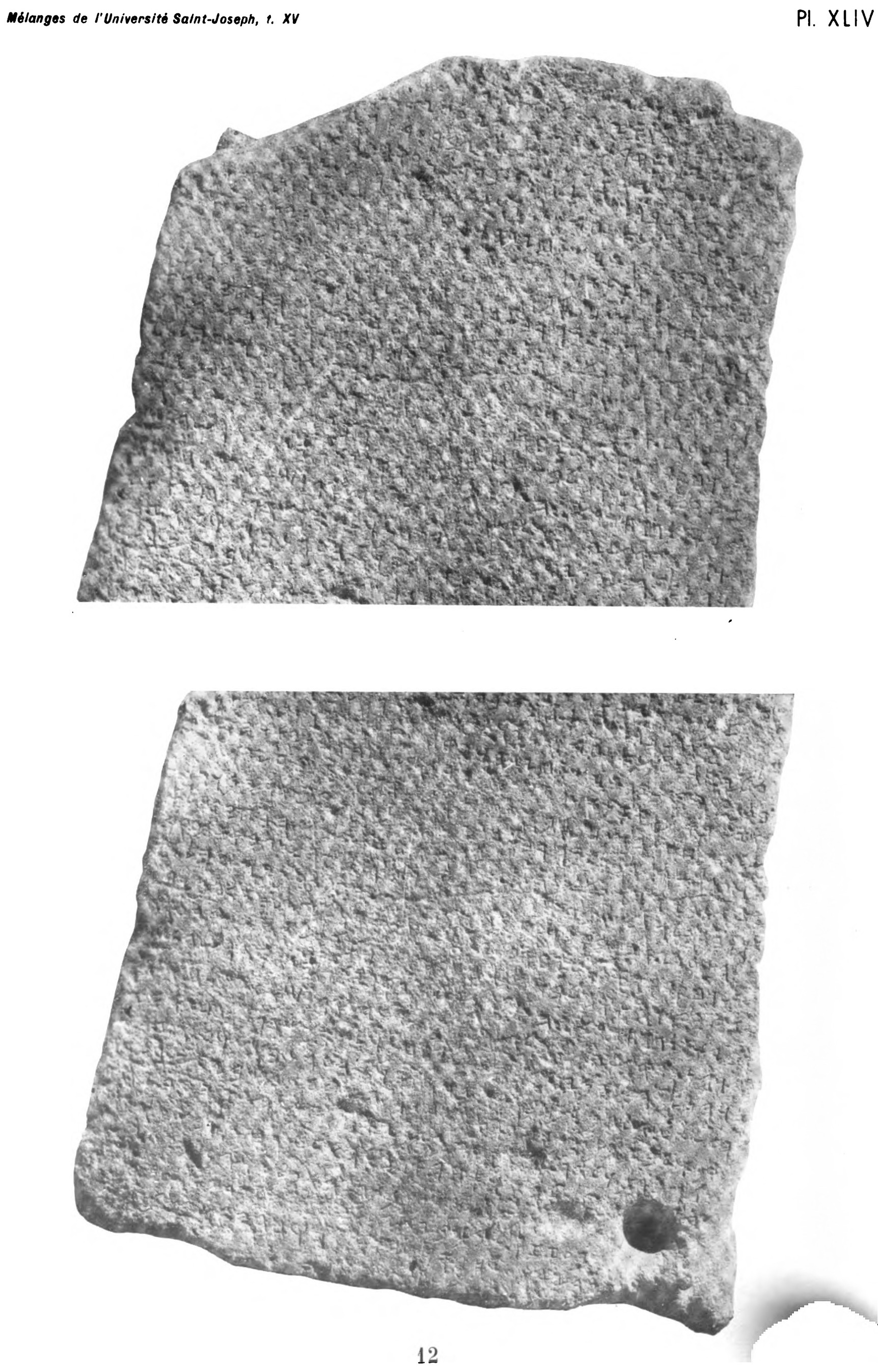

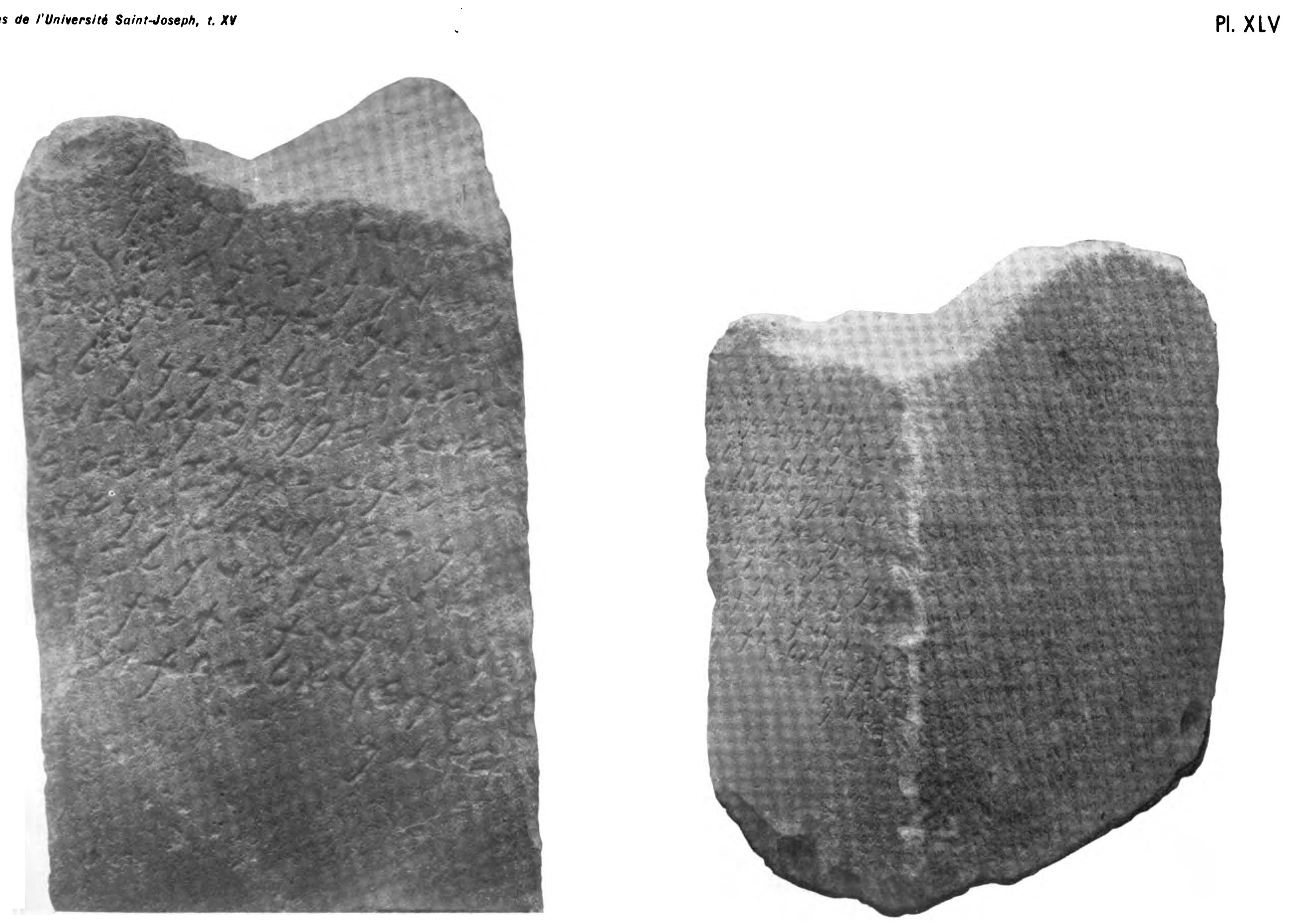

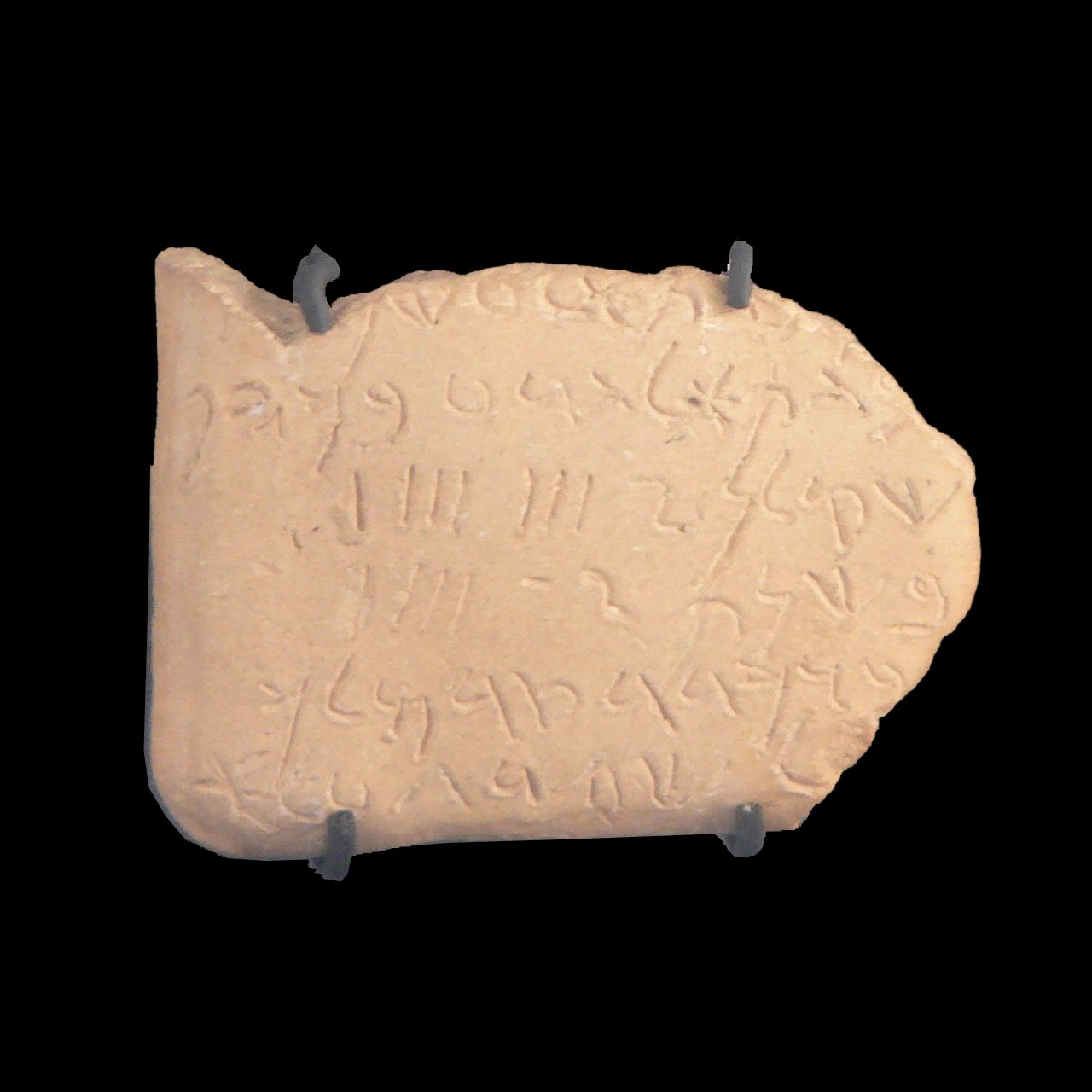
KAI 227, "Starcky Tablet", AO 21063

== Bibliography ==
=== Steles I and II ===
- Dussaud René. Nouvelles inscriptions araméennes de Séfiré, près d'Alep. In: Comptes rendus des séances de l'Académie des Inscriptions et Belles-Lettres, 75^{e} année, N. 4, 1931. pp. 312-321. DOI : https://doi.org/10.3406/crai.1931.76102
- Ronzevalle, S., "Fragments d'inscriptions araméennes des environs d'Alep." Mélanges de l'Université Saint-Joseph, 15 (1930-31): 237–60
- Cantineau, Jean, "Remarques sur la stèle araméenne de Sefiré-Soudjin." RA 28 (1931): 167–178
- Hempel, J. and Bauer, H., "Zeitschriftenschau: Mélanges de l'Université Saint-Joseph. Beyrouth (Liban) XV (1930)." ZAW 50 (1932): 178–83
- Driver, G.R., "Notes on the Aramaic Inscription from Soudschin." AfO 8 (1932-33): 203–6
- Friedrich, J. and Landsberger, B., "Zu der altaramäischen Stele von Sudschin." ZA 41 (1933): 313–18

=== Stele III ===
- Dupont-Sommer, A. and Starcky, Jean, "Une inscription araméenne inédite de Sfiré." BMB 13 (1956 [appeared 1958]): 23–41 + pls. I-VI. Sf.3
- Dupont-Sommer, A., "Une stèle araméenne inédite de Sfiré (Syrie) du VIIIe siècle avant J.-C.." CRAIBL (1957a): 245–48. Sf.3
- Fitzmyer, Joseph A., "The Aramaic Suzerainty Treaty from Sefire in the Museum of Beirut." CBQ 20 (1958): 444–76. Sf.3

=== All Steles ===
- Dupont-Sommer André. Les inscriptions araméennes de Sfiré (stèles I et II). In: Mémoires présentés par divers savants à l'Académie des inscriptions et belles-lettres de l'Institut de France. Première série, Sujets divers d'érudition. Tome 15, 1e partie, 1960. pp. 197-349. DOI : https://doi.org/10.3406/mesav.1960.1129
- Fitzmyer, Joseph A. (1967). The Aramaic Inscriptions of Sefîre. Biblica et Orientalia (sacra scriptura antiquitatibus orientalibus illustrata). Vol. 19. Rome: Pontifical Biblical Institute. OCLC 467201.
- Fitzmyer, J. (1961). The Aramaic Inscriptions of Sefire I and II. Journal of the American Oriental Society, 81(3), 178-222. doi:10.2307/595652
- Greenfield, Jonas C., "Three Notes on the Sefire Inscription," JSS 11 (1966), 98-105.
