= Henri Pognon =

French diplomat, archaeologist and epigrapher

- Born: Paul Pascal Henri Pognon; 13 May 1853; Clermont-Ferrand
- Died: 16 March 1921 (aged 67); Chambéry
- Occupations: Archaeologist; Epigrapher; Assyriologist

Henri Pognon (13 May 1853 – 16 March 1921) was a French archaeologist, epigrapher, and specialist in Assyriology.

== Diplomatic career ==
The son of an ingénieur des ponts et chaussées, Henri Pognon passed his baccalauréat at the lycée of Clermont-Ferrand before moving to Paris where he studied law, graduated from the École des langues orientales and was a student at the École pratique des hautes études. In 1878, he created the course of Assyrian language proposed by that latter institution, and was responsible for teaching until 1881. He then embraced the diplomatic career. Entered in the Ministère des Affaires étrangères in the position of attaché to the direction of consulates in May 1879, he was appointed deputy consul at Tripoli in September 1881, passed to Beirut in May 1882 and then was reinstated in the position of Tripoli in May 1884. Transferred to the Baghdad consulate as manager in May 1887, he was promoted 2nd class consul in August of the same year. Made a chevalier of the Légion d'honneur on 31 December 1892, he was elevated to the rank of first class consul in February 1895 and appointed consul of France in Aleppo (Syria) August 27, 1895.

In this capacity he reported the Hamidian massacres whose victims were 6000 Armenians on 28 October 1896. Placed on availability with the rank of consul general May 22, 1904, he was admitted to retirement in 1914.

== Archaeological and epigraphic activities ==
Alongside his diplomatic career, Henri Pognon engaged in Mesopotamian archeology in Lebanon, Syria, and Iraq. Combining field discoveries, acquisitions from local scouts and official prospecting missions, he collected Semitic inscriptions whose meaning he penetrated through an intense translation work. A specialist of classical languages, he thus could provide numerous reference publications to research.

In 1883 he discovered two important inscriptions on bas-reliefs from the reign of Nebuchadnezzar II in the Wadi Brissa in Lebanon.

He produced a pioneer work with his publication in 1898 on the Mandaic incantation bowls from Khouabir, a cemetery site near the bank of the Euphrates southwest of Baghdad, which was proceeded by the first published Mandaic bowl from Adab (Tell Bismaya).

He was elected a member of the Société de Linguistique de Paris in 1884.

By 1922, some manuscripts that belonged to him were given to the Bibliothèque nationale de France. His collection of Syriac manuscripts, gathered in Aleppo and Mosul, is the origin of much of the Graffin funds which in turn joined the Bibliothèque nationale de France in 1989.

== Publications ==
=== Books ===
- 1879–1880: L'Inscription de Bavian, texte, traduction et commentaire philologique, Paris, Bibliothèque de l'École des hautes études. Sciences philologiques et historiques, 2 fascicules (100 and 220 p.), reprint 2011.
- 1884: Inscription de Mérou-Nérar Ier, roi d'Assyrie, Paris, Imprimerie nationale (124 p.).
- 1887: Les inscriptions babyloniennes du Wadi Brissa, Bibliothèque de l'École des hautes études. Sciences philologiques et historiques (199 p.), reprint 2011.
- 1898: Inscriptions mandaïtes des coupes de Khouabir : texte, traduction et commentaire philologique avec quatre appendices et un glossaire, Paris, H. Wetter (327 p.), reprint Amsterdam, Philo Press 1979.
- 1903: Une version syriaque des Aphorismes d'Hippocrate, texte et traduction, Leipzig, J. C. Hinrichs (2 volumes).
- 1907: Inscriptions sémitiques de la Syrie, de la Mésopotamie et de la région de Mossoul, Paris, J. Gabalda (228 p.).

=== Articles ===
- 1883: « Inscription de Mérou-Nérar Ier, roi d'Assyrie », Journal asiatique
- 1884: « Trois textes funéraires de Palmyre », Journal asiatique
- 1885: « Rapport de Henri Pognon, consul-suppléant de France à Beyrouth à M. Patrimono, consul de Beyrouth », Revue Assyrienne
- 1887: « Sur un plat avec inscription punique », Journal asiatique
- 1888: « Découverte de contrats de l'époque de la 1ère dynastie de Babylone », Journal asiatique
- 1891: « Deux briques avec légendes araméennes », Journal asiatique
- 1892: « Note sur le pays d'Achnounnak », Comptes rendus des séances de l'Académie des Inscriptions et Belles-Lettres
- 1892: « Une incantation contre les génies malfaisants en mandaïte », Mémoires de la Société de linguistique de Paris
- 1892: « Note sur des inscriptions ouigoures, arabes et syriaques de Baghdad », Journal asiatique
- 1894: « L'Inscription de Raman-Nérar Ier, roi d'Assyrie (réponse à un article de M. Oppert) », Bulletin de la Société de linguistique de Paris
- 1911: « Chronologie des papyrus araméens d'Eléphantine », Journal asiatique
- 1912: « Lexicographie assyrienne », Revue Assyrienne
- 1913: « Mélanges assyriologiques », Journal asiatique
- 1915–17: « Sur les Yézidis du Sindjar », Revue de l'Orient Chrétien
- 1917: « Notes lexicographiques et textes assyriens inédits », Journal asiatique
- 1918–19: « Documents relatifs à Ahikar », Revue de l'Orient Chrétien
- 1921: « Notes assyriologiques », Journal asiatique
