= Nuhašše =

Historical region

Nuhašše Nuhašše
- Middle Bronze–Late Bronze
- Capital: Nuhašše
- Religion: Levantine Religion
- Government: Petty Kingdom, principalities, federation
- Historical era: Middle-Late Bronze
  - Established: Middle Bronze
  - Disestablished: Late Bronze
Preceded by	Succeeded by
Nuhašše	Hittite Empire
- Today part of: Syria

Nuhašše's location in Syria

Nuhašše (Akkadian: ^{kur}nu-ḫa-áš-še; ^{kur}nu-ḫa-še^{ki}) or Nuġasse (Ugaritic: 𐎐𐎙𐎘, nġṯ; Egyptian: n-g-ś) was a region in northwestern Syria that flourished in the 2nd millennium BC. It was east of the Orontes River bordering Aleppo (northwest) and Qatna (south). It was a petty kingdom or federacy of principalities probably under a high king. Tell Khan Sheykhun has tenatively been identified as ^{kur}nu-ḫa-še^{ki}.

== Name, borders and society ==
The Semitic name "Nuhašše" means "rich, prosperous". Nuhašše stretched from the Euphrates valley in the east to the Orontes valley in the west between Hamath in the south and Aleppo in the north; it did not include Ebla and it was separated from the Euphrates river by Emar and Ashtata. In the west, it reached the Orontes river only if it included the region of Niya which is debated. The main city was named Ugulzat (possibly modern Khan Shaykhun). Hittite texts mention the "Kings of Nuhašše", indicating that the region consisted of a number of petty kingdoms that might have formed a confederacy; one of the monarchs took the role of primus inter pares (first among equals), and resided in Ugulzat.

The majority of the population in the second half of the second millennium BC was West-Semitic, while the ruling classes were Hurrians. The diplomatic language used in the region was a Hurrianized form of Akkadian as Hurrian traits appear in every Akkadian sentence in tablets written in Nuhašše; the Hurrian elements comprise around one fifth of each sentence. The coronation of a king included anointing; a common practice in Bronze Age monarchies of Western Asia.

== History ==
=== Middle Bronze ===
The name Nuhašše appears in a bilingual Hittite-Hurrian text (named the Song of Release) which is copied from a Hurrian original dating to 2000 BC. In the Hurrian text, Nuhašše was a close ally of Ebla.

==== Middle Bronze IIA ====
The region was mentioned also in the archive of Mari and in the archive of Alalakh but did not designate a politically unified entity; at the times of Mari, the northern regions of Nuhašše were under the supremacy of Yamhad while the southern ones were subordinate to Qatna.

=== Late Bronze ===
The petty kingdom of Nuhašše changed hands between great powers in the region such as Egypt, Mitanni and the Hittites.

==== Egypto-Mitanni Conflict ====
Thutmose I conducted military campaigns in the region reaching the Euphrates River. Thutmose III (c. 1470 BC) annexed the region, then Mitanni established its rule over the area.

==== Hittite Period ====
Šuppiluliuma I fought a series of military campaigns ("Great Syrian Wars", c. 1350-1345 BC) against Tushratta of Mitanni (d. 1345 BC following the Siege of Carchemish), attacking and annexing the region. Tutankhamun also died, causing Suppiluliuma I to become the most powerful ruler in the Near East controlling large parts of Anatolia and Syria. The Amarna archives (c. 1350 BC) reveals that Nuhašše was engaged in territorial disputes with its neighbour Amurru. Amurru had swiftly aligned itself with the Hittites.

A Hittite treaty dating to the reign of Muwatalli II, 13th century BC, mentions earlier border disputes between Nuhašše and Aleppo to the northwest where the people of Nuhašše asked the Mitannian king to interfere; the king campaigned against Aleppo and gave the disputed lands to Nuhašše. The treaty mentions that the people of Aleppo committed an offence against a Hittite monarch called Hattusili and the Nuhašše petitioned the former for districts belonging to Aleppo; The Hittites granted Nuhašše its request. The date of the border disputes in which the Hittites interfered is related to the date of the monarch named Hattusili but the identity of that king is mysterious but could have reigned as co-king of Arnuwanda I, early 14th century BC.

In Hittite clay tablet (CTH 63), Barga and Nuḫašše disputed the dominion of the city Yaruqatta (^{uru}i-ia-ru-wata-an/aš).

King	Reigned	Notes
Taku	c. 1470-1450 BC	Crowned by Thutmose III
[...]		Other kings during 100 years
Šarrupši	c. 1350 BC	Time of Suppiluliuma I
Adad-Nirari	c. 1350 BC	Time of Suppiluliuma I
Tette (part I)	c. 13xx-1322 BC	Time of Suppiluliuma I
Šummittara	c. 1322 BC	Time of Suppiluliuma I
Tette (part II)	c. 13xx-131x BC	Time of Mursili II and Horemheb
Zirtaya (servant, not recognized)	13xx-13xx BC	Time of Mursili II

Tette of Nuḫašše () was the grandson of Šarrupši and was installed by king Šuppiluliuma I as the new king in a vassal treaty (CTH 53). When Šuppiluliuma I died around 1323 BC, the population's confidence in Tette decreased. The office was given to his brother, Šummittara. Tette staged a revolt against his brother and returned to the trone, being installed by Muršili II. In a Hittite document ( KUB 19.15 + KBo 50.4), Tette tried to enlist Egypt as a partner when Nuḫašše (as apparently also Kinza ) rose in rebellion against the Hittites. The prevailing opinion equates this rebellion with the seventh year of Muršili's reign, but there are also opinions according to which it took place in the ninth year of Muršili's reign. From Egypt, which may actually have undertaken a campaign into Syria, the Hittite king demanded Tette's extradition in a letter addressed to Arma'a (Horemheb).

Zirtaya () seem to have taken the throne as Tette was in Egypt. In KUB 19.15 he is called a "servant", and was not recognized by Mursili II who pointed out that he had failed to bring him Tette.

=== Iron Age ===
In the Iron Age, the region became known as Lu'ash. Tell Afis may have been part of Nuḫašše, later becoming an administrative center under Hattusili III. It became the capital of Lu'ash.
