= Luhuti =

Iron Age Neo-Hittite Aramean region

Luhuti Lukhuti - Lu'ash
- Luhuti (Luash) Location, Showing The Capital (Afis)
- Capital: Hatarikka (Afis)
- Common languages: Aramaic
- Religion: Levantine Religion
- Historical era: Iron Age
Preceded by	Succeeded by
Nuhašše	Neo-Assyrian Empire
- Today part of: Syria

Luhuti, Lukhuti or Lu'ash, was a Neo-Hittite region during the early 1st millennium BC, located in northern Syria, in an area that used to be called Nuhašše.

== Political situation and capital ==
Luhuti was a region of uncertain political status, known primarily from Assyrian inscriptions, and the stele of king Zakkur of Hamath. Luhuti is never attested as a kingdom of its own or as having a single central authority, although it did constitute an independent interconnected region. The Assyrian inscriptions that describe Luhuti as a country with many cities and troops.

Luhuti had many cities. Shuksi was the maritime center, But the most important center and capital was the city of Hazrik (modern Tell Afis, Known as Hatarikka to the Assyrians), located 45 kilometres (28 mi) south of Aleppo.

== History ==
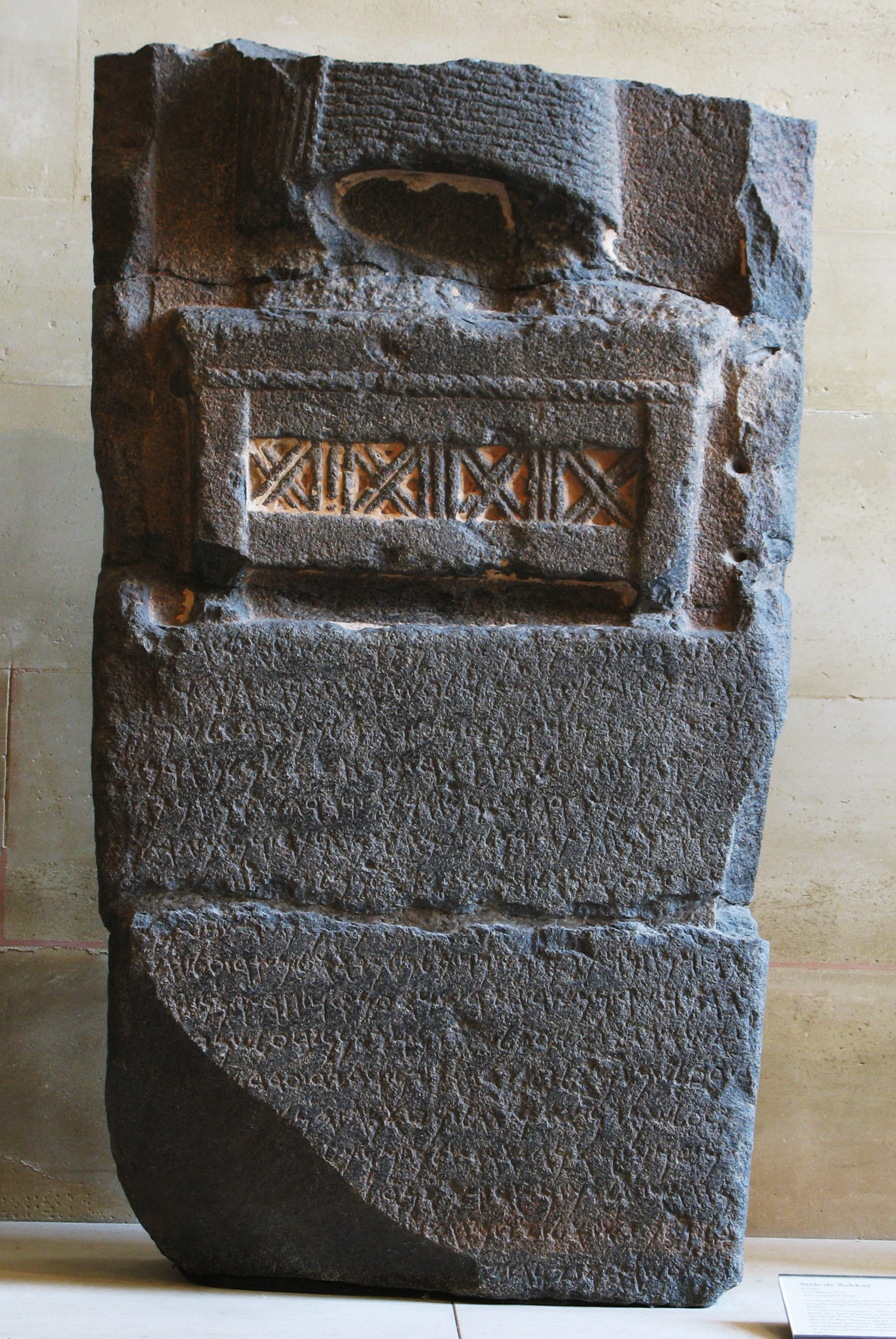
Zakkur Stele discovered at Hatarikka

Luhuti was first attested in 870 BC. The inscriptions of Ashurnasirpal II record his conquest of its neighbour Pattin, then his use of Pattin's subordinate city of Aribua as his military base for operations against Luhuti. Ashurnasirpal devastated the country, impaled Luhuti soldiers on stakes outside their captured cities.

By 796 BC Luhuti was incorporated into Hamath, forming the northern province of the kingdom. King Zakkur of Hamath titled himself King of Hamath and Luhuti. Zakkur was besieged in Hatarikka by a coalition of Syrian kings incited by Ben-Hadad III of Aram-Damascus, and led by a king descended from Gusi identified as the king of Bit Agusi, Zakkur survived the siege and commemorated the event by commissioning the Stele of Zakkur.

Luhuti was attacked by Shalmaneser IV in 765 BC and Ashur-dan III in 755 BC. It was finally incorporated into Assyria as a province by Tiglath-Pileser III in 737 BC.

=== Royal family hypothesis ===
Hittitologists Trevor R. Bryce and especially John David Hawkins believe Zakkur to be a usurper, The Stele of Zakkur does not mention any royal ancestors. Hawkins believes that Zakkur was an Aramean usurper local to Luhuti who replaced the old Hittite dynasty ruling in Hamath.
