= Shammuramat =

Ancient Assyrian queen

- Woman of the Palace (Note: Though usually used by historians today, the title of "queen" as such did not exist in the Neo-Assyrian Empire. The feminine version of the word for king (šarrum) was šarratum, but this was reserved for goddesses and foreign queens who ruled in their own right. Because the consorts of the kings did not rule themselves, they were not regarded as their equals and as such not called šarratum. Instead, the term reserved for the primary consort was MUNUS É.GAL (woman of the palace). In Assyrian, this term was rendered issi ekalli, later abbreviated to sēgallu.)
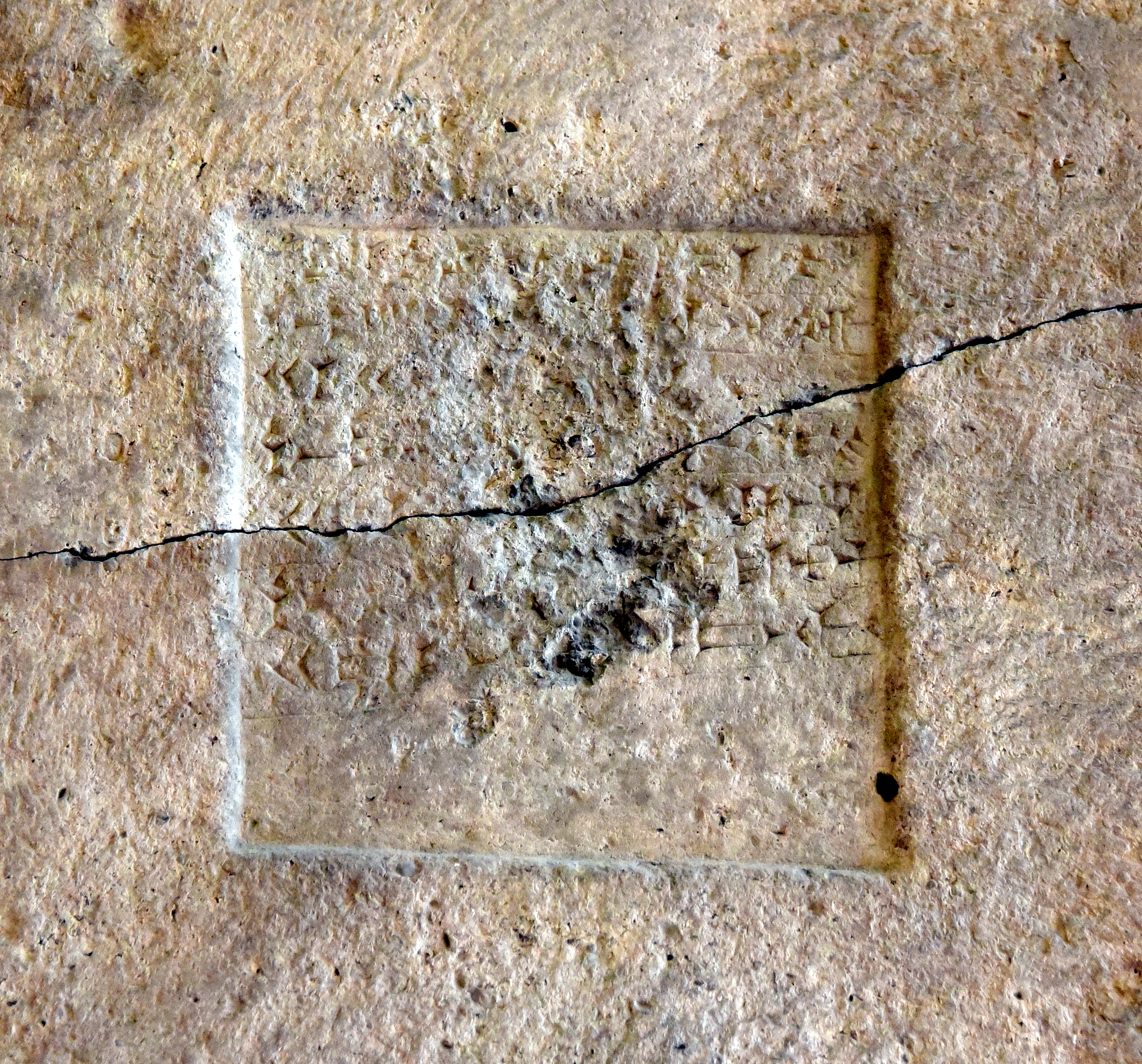
- Inscription on a stele erected in Assur by Shammuramat (Note: The text reads "stele of Shammuramat, queen of Shamshi-Adad, king of the Universe, king of Assyria, mother of Adad-nirari, king of the Universe, king of Assyria, daughter-in-law of Shalmaneser, king of the Four Corners".)
- Born: c. 850 BC
- Died: c. 798 BC (aged c. 52)
- Spouse: Shamshi-Adad V
- Issue: Adad-nirari III
- Akkadian: Sammu-rāmat or Sammu-ramāt

Shammuramat (Akkadian: Sammu-rāmat or Sammu-ramāt), (Note: For alternate transliterations and the etymology of the name, see the "name" section) also known as Sammuramat or Shamiram and Semiramis, was a powerful queen of the Neo-Assyrian Empire. Beginning her career as the primary queen consort (Note: Assyrian kings at times had multiple wives at the same time, but not all were recognized as queens (or "women of the palace"). Though it has been disputed in the past, it appears that only one woman bore the title at any given time, as the term typically appears without qualifiers (indicating a lack of ambiguity).) of the king Shamshi-Adad V (r. 824–811 BC), Shammuramat reached an unusually prominent position in the reign of her son Adad-nirari III (r. 811–783 BC). Though there is dispute in regard to Shammuramat's formal status and position, and if she should be considered a coregent, it is clear that she was among the most powerful and influential women of the ancient Near East and the Iron Age in general; she is the only known Assyrian queen to have retained her status as queen after the death of her husband and the only known woman from Mesopotamia to have partaken in, and perhaps even led, a military campaign.

Shammuramat's origin is unclear; her name could equally well be of West or East Semitic origin. Proposed regions of origin include the Akkadian-speaking Assyria itself, the ethnolinguistically indistinguishable Babylonia (which spoke the Babylonian variety of Akkadian), the Levant and Phoenicia. If originating from abroad, she is typically assumed to have been a princess. Nothing is known of her life or relative influence and power in the reign of her husband. Under Adad-nirari, her role was exceptionally prominent for a woman of the time. Per the Pazarcık Stele, she accompanied her son on a campaign against the Hittites Kummuh in Hittite and both she and Adad-nirari are credited with expanding the borders of the empire in all directions into the Levant, Anatolia and Persia. In some inscriptions, local governors made dedications not only to the king (as was customary) but also to Shammuramat. All evidence suggests that Shammuramat was among the most renowned figures of her time.

Shammuramat was immortalized in later Persian, Levantine and Greco-Roman literary tradition as the legendary Assyrian warrior-queen and heroine Semiramis, a half-divine daughter of the North Syrian goddess Atargatis and the wife of the fictional Ninus, the legendary and mythical founder of Nineveh and the Assyrian Empire. Among the legendary feats ascribed to Semiramis were securing victory during a siege of Bactra, the foundation of Babylon, and the invention of a type of pants/trousers later popular among the Medes, Persians and Parthians. Numerous parallels can be drawn between the historical Shammuramat and the legendary Semiramis, whose feats are mythical rather than historical. Semiramis and Shammuramat are both still used as popular given names for girls among the Assyrian people today.

== Background ==
=== Name ===
Shammuramat's name, spelt mí.sa-am-mu–ra-mat in Assyrian inscriptions (transliterated as Sammu-rāmat, Sammu-ramāt or Šammu-ramat), is of either West Semitic or East Semitic Akkadian origin. In West Semitic it would likely have been rendered as šmyrm or šmrmt. The most likely etymology of the name is that it follows a common name archetype in both West Semitic and Akkadian, on the form dn-rāmu/rāmat ("dn is exalted") in West Semitic or dn-ramāt ("dn is beloved") in Akkadian, where dn is a theophoric (name of a god) element. Sammu, rendered as ^{d}sa(-a)-mu (meaning "red"), was the name of an otherwise poorly attested deity in the Neo-Assyrian period.

Various alternate etymologies have also been proposed. In Classical Greek sources, Shammuramat's name appears in the forms Σεμίραμις (Semíramis) and Σεμύραμις (Semúramis). According to the 1st-century BC Classical Greek historian Diodorus Siculus, the name ultimately derived from the Assyrian/Akkadian/Babylonian word for "dove", an etymology probably based on equating Σεμι- (Semi-) with the Akkadian summatu or summu (meaning dove). The 7th-century Jewish midrash Leviticus Rabbah traces the etymology of the name to the West Semitic šmy rʿm ("thunder of heaven"), relating it to a legend that she was born in thunder. In 1991, Moshe Weinfeld suggested that the name derived from the Phoenician šmm rmm ("high heavens").

=== Origin ===
Shammuramat was born c. 850 BC. Nothing is known of Shammuramat's origins from contemporary sources. In later classical tradition, Shammuramat was variously described as being of Levantine or native Assyrian/Mesopotamian origin. Various alternate origins have also been suggested by modern historians, though all such proposals are mere speculation. In 1910, Carl Ferdinand Friedrich Lehmann-Haupt suggested that she was a Mesopotamian Babylonian princess, though there is no evidence for such an idea. Wilhelm Eilers proposed in 1971 that she might have been a princess from Urartu and in 1991, Weinfeld suggested that she was a princess from Ashkelon. Ashkelon seems an unlikely place of origin because the city was situated far beyond the Assyrian imperial ambitions of the time and since it would be unlikely for an Assyrian king to marry someone from a city of such little diplomatic weight. In 2001, Jamie Novotny proposed that she could have been an Assyrian or Aramean princess from Syria, perhaps from either Carchemish, Gurgum, Namri, Que, Patina, Subria, Bit Adini or Samʼal.

== Status and activities ==
=== Reign of Shamshi-Adad V ===
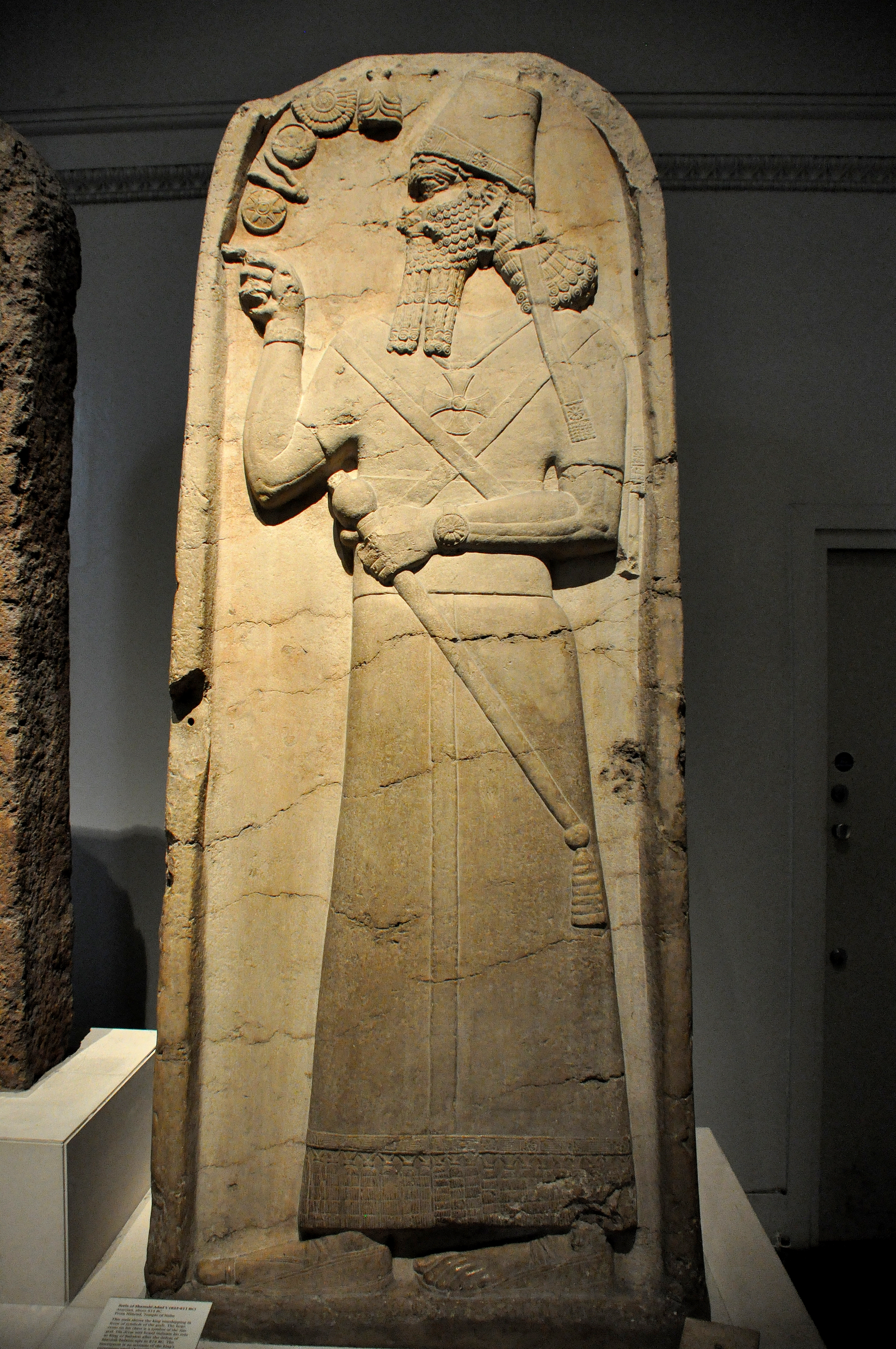
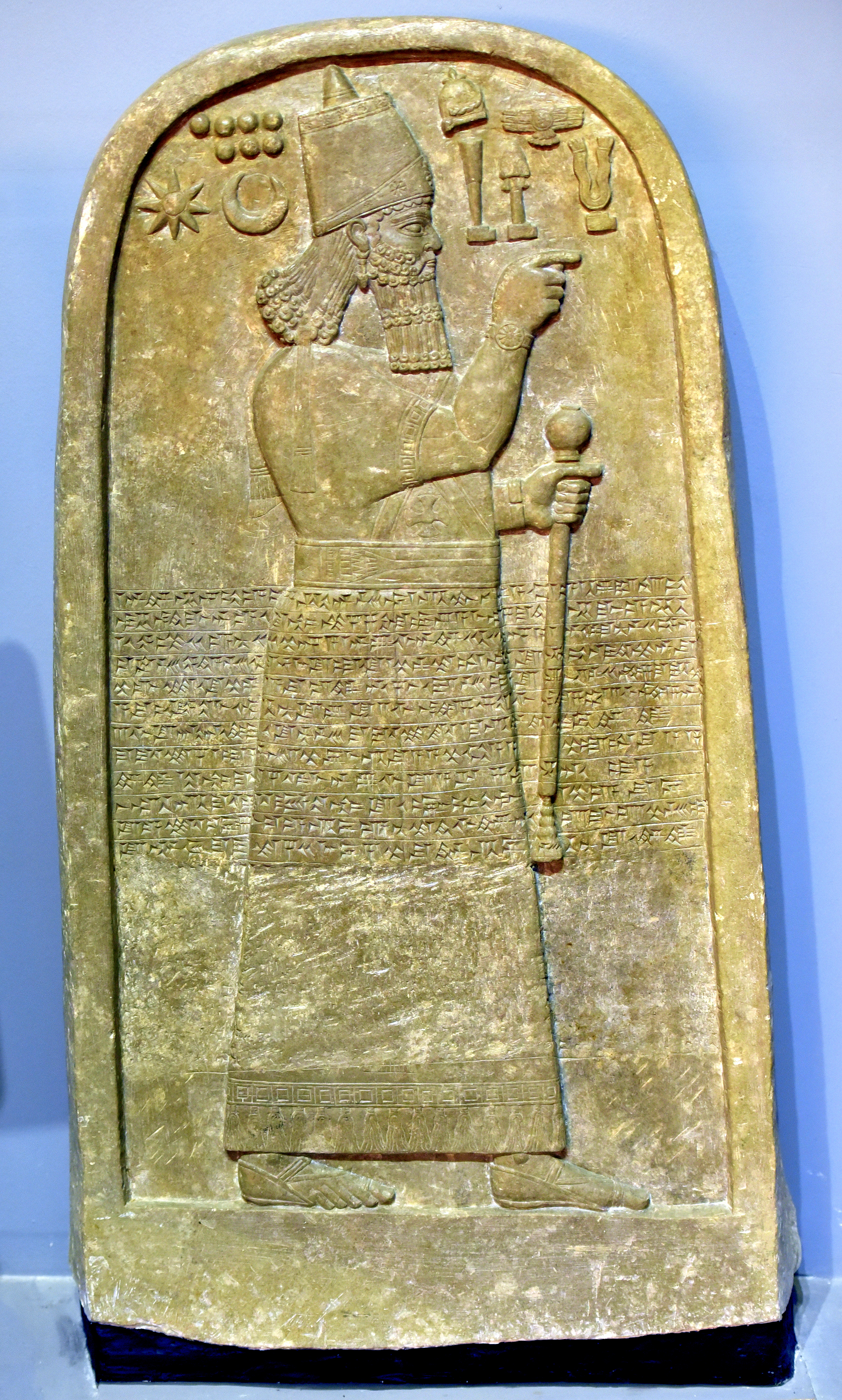
Stelae of Shammuramat's husband Shamshi-Adad V (r. 824–811 BC; left) and their son Adad-nirari III (r. 811–783 BC; right)

Shammuramat was the wife and queen of the Neo-Assyrian king Shamshi-Adad V (r. 824–811 BC). The surviving source material concerning Shammuramat is relatively limited. In known material from her husband's reign, she is only mentioned in a single eye bead inscribed with her name. Her role and influence at the court of her husband is as such largely unknown. The inscription on the eye bead reads:

To Ishtar, her lady, Shammuramat, queen of Shamshi-Adad, king of Assyria, dedicated (this) for her well-being.

=== Reign of Adad-nirari III ===
Shammuramat is more prominently attested in the reign of her son Adad-nirari III (r. 811–783 BC), when she reached an unusually prominent position. Though Adad-nirari was probably not a minor upon his accession to the throne, he is generally assumed to have been quite young, which might partly explain why Shammuramat was allowed to take such a prominent role. Because of the limited source material, her exact role and position remains disputed, though it is clear that she was among the most renowned figures of her time.

In 2013, David Kertai suggested that Shammuramat's continued use of the title "queen" in her son's reign, the only certain Assyrian example of this, (Note: The only other queen who has been suggested to have retained her status in this way is the earlier Mulissu-mukannishat-Ninua, queen of Ashurnasirpal II (r. 883–859 BC), whose funerary inscription records her as "queen of Ashurnasirpal and Shalmaneser"; the evidence is in her case not conclusive and several alternate explanations have been proposed. From the time of Sennacherib (r. 705–681) onwards, former queens could in the reign of their sons be titled ummi šari ("Mother of the King").) could indicate that she for a time was queen regnant. In 2004, Sarah C. Melville wrote that Shammuramat was "probably not" co-regent with her son but in 2014, she wrote that Shammuramat "possibly even acted as regent during the early years of her son's reign". Writing in 2013, Stephanie Dalley did not believe that Shammuramat was co-regent with Adad-nirari. Several recent researchers, such as Saana Svärd and Sebastian Fink, in their writings simply mention that whether she could be considered a co-regent is still a matter of debate. In 2012, Svärd wrote that regardless of her formal position, Shammuramat was clearly an authoritative female figure who played an important role in running the empire, perhaps acting as a sort of pater familias after the death of Shamshi-Adad while her son was young. Shammuramat does not appear in later Assyrian accounts, (Note: She is for instance not included in the Assyrian King List.) perhaps, per Svärd, due to Assyrian royal ideology finding it difficult to "accommodate the presence of an authoritative female figure".

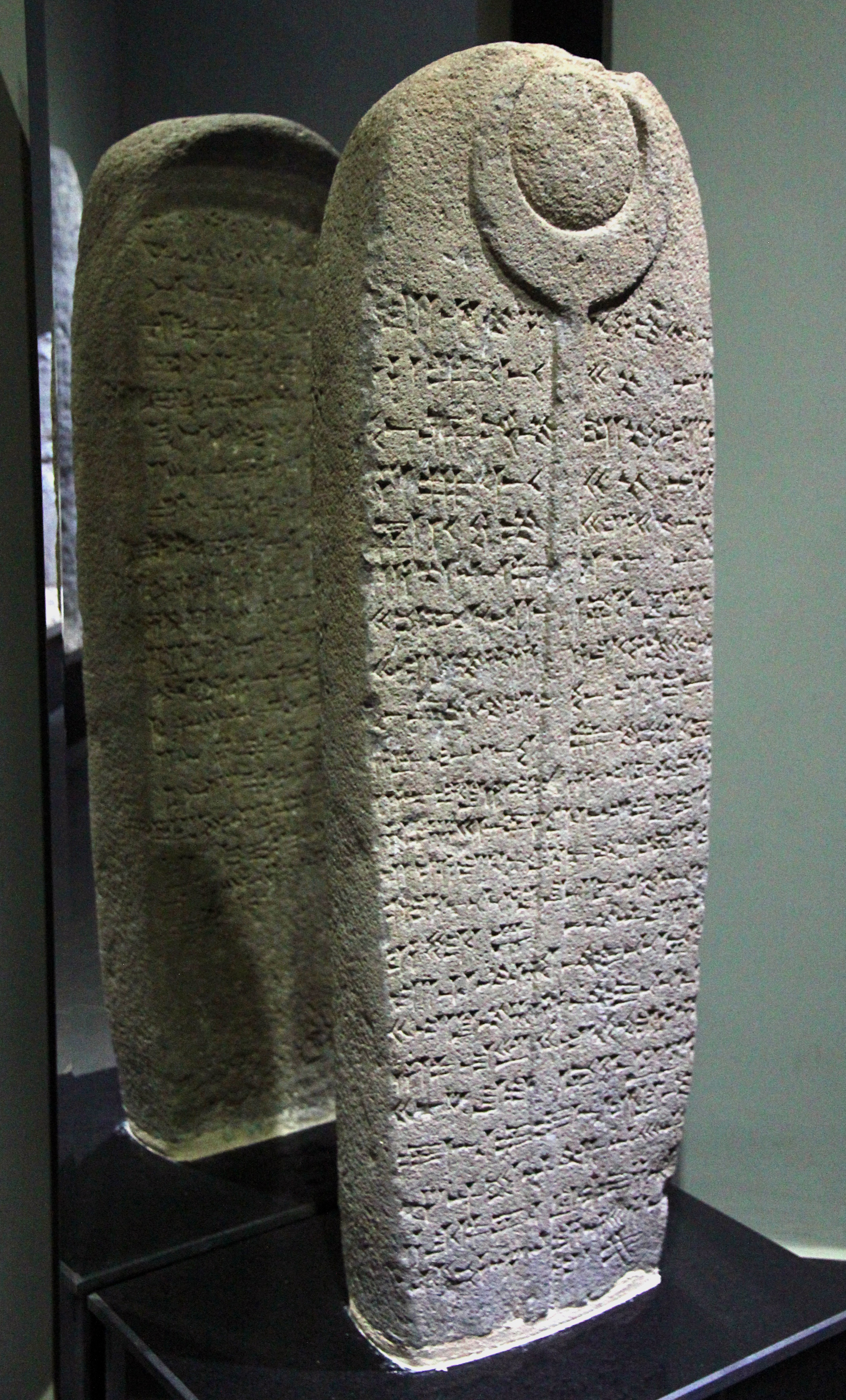
The Pazarcık Stele, which mentions Shammuramat's participation in a campaign against Kummuh

The most serious indicator of Shammuramat's exceptional power and influence, and the main evidence used by scholars who support her being a co-regent, is a boundary stele (marker of the border) erected by Adad-nirari near modern-day Pazarcık in Turkey. Variations in the often formulaic Assyrian royal inscriptions were typically historically and ideologically important. The Pazarcık Stele establishes that Shammuramat accompanied her son on a military campaign against the Kingdom of Kummuh in Syria; she is the only known ancient Assyrian woman to take part in a campaign. In 2020, Sebastian Fink suggested that the fact that she was mentioned as prominently as she was in the text might indicate that the campaign was in fact led by Shammuramat and that Adad-nirari was not present. The inscription on the stele ascribes the fighting activities themselves solely to Adad-nirari, anything else would not have been possible in Assyrian ideology, but the important activity of extending Assyrian territory and setting up the stele, otherwise a traditional privilege only of the king, is attributed to both Adad-nirari and Shammuramat, as indicated by a plural "they". It is furthermore significant that the stele outlines Adad-nirari's descent from both Shamshi-Adad and Shammuramat, given that kings usually only mentioned their paternal lineage. In full, the inscription on the boundary stele reads:

Boundary stone of Adad-nirari, king of Assyria, son of Shamshi-Adad, king of Assyria (and of) Shammuramat, queen of Shamshi-Adad, king of Assyria, mother of Adad-nirari, mighty king, king of Assyria, daughter-in-law of Shalmaneser, king of the Four Corners. When Ušpilulume, king of Kummuh, caused Adad-nirari, king of Assyria (and) Shammuramat, queen, to cross the Euphrates river; I smashed Attar-šumkī, son of Abī-rāmi, of the city Arpad, together with eight kings, who were with him at the city Paqarḫubunu, their boundary and land. I deprived them of their camp. In order to save their lives, they went up (the mountains). In that year they put up this boundary stone between Ušpilulume, king of Kummuh and Qalparuda, son of Palalam, king of Gurgum. Whoever takes it away from the possession of Ušpilulume, his sons, his grandsons, may the gods Ashur, Marduk, Adad, Sîn, (and) Shamash not support his lawsuit. Prohibition of Ashur, my god, (and) Sîn, who dwells in Harran.

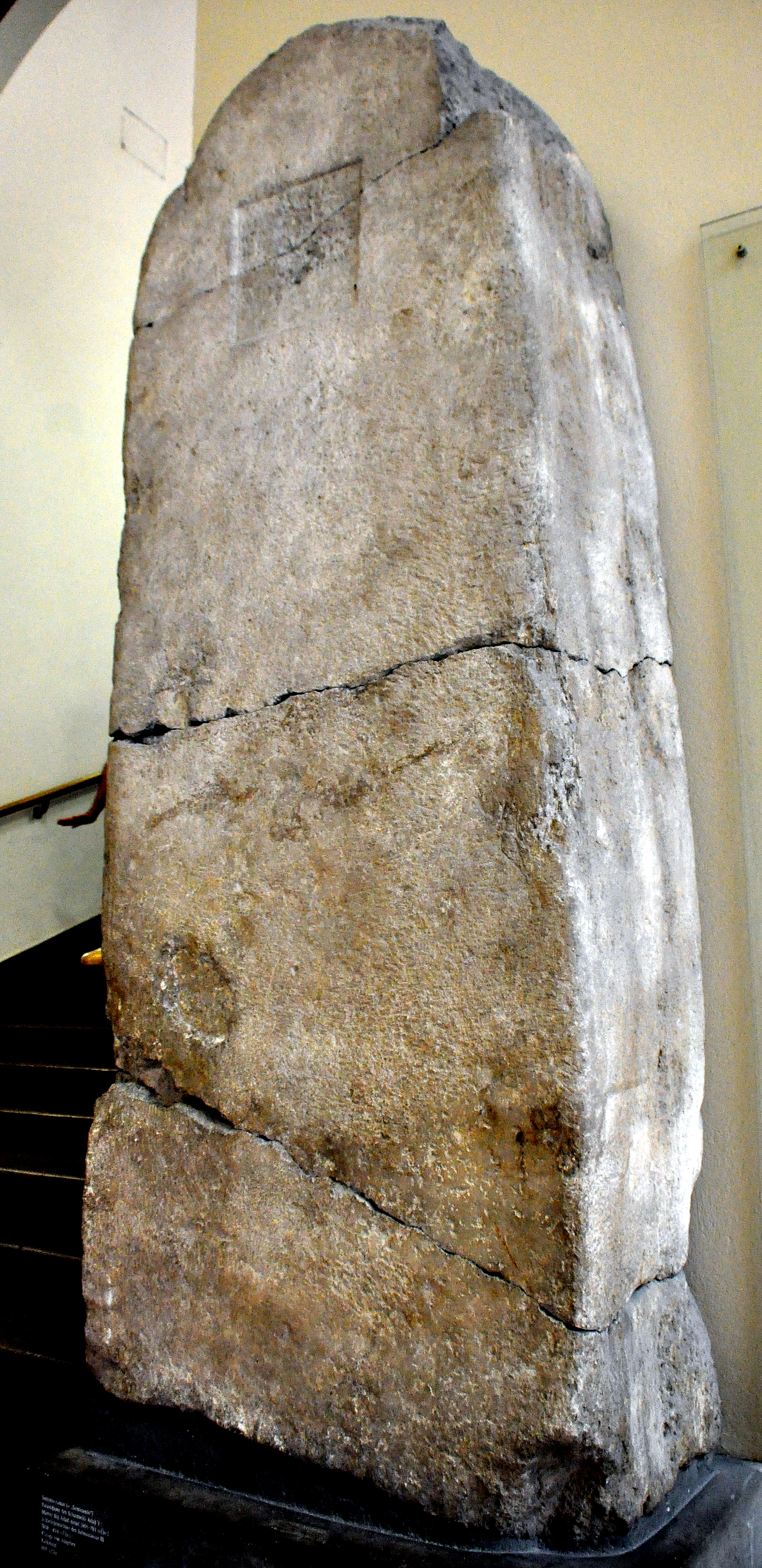
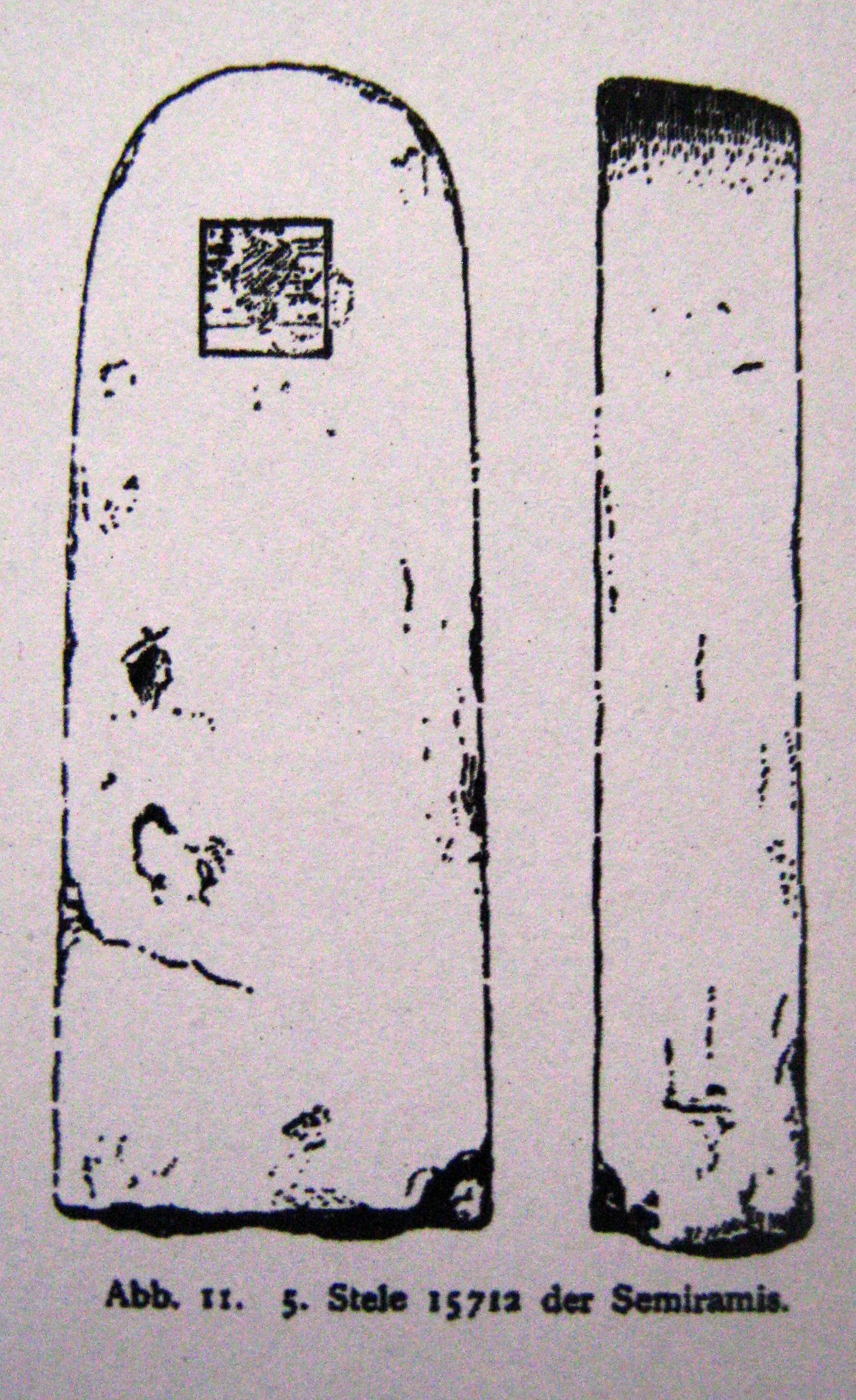
Photograph and drawing of Shammuramat's stele from Assur

Shammuramat was a famous figure already in her lifetime. Among the so-called stelenreihen, a set of steles erected centrally in Assur, the religious and ceremonial heart of the Neo-Assyrian Empire, there are innumerable steles erected by kings and influential male officials and generals, but only three erected by women (the other two women being Libbāli-šarrat, the queen of Ashurbanipal, and an unknown wife of Sennacherib). Though the function and purpose of these stelae remains unknown, it is obvious that only exceptional women were able to erect their own stelae among the others. Shammuramat's stele at Assur gives her the same titles as in the Pazarcık boundary stele.

Shammuramat is mentioned in inscriptions on two identical statues from Kalhu, the Assyrian capital. These inscriptions record that the statues were dedicated to the god Nabu by Bel-tarṣi-ilumma, governor of Kalhu, who set them up in the god's temple in the city. After a passage praising Nabu, both inscriptions record that Bel-tarṣi-ilumma had the status made and dedicated "for the life of" Adad-nirari, king of Assyria, and Shammuramat, queen. Typically, only the king was mentioned.

A previously accepted chief piece of evidence for Shammuramat having ruled the empire was the Saba'a Stele, erected by Adad-nirari in 806 BC. Older translations of the stele, such as a 1927 translation by Daniel David Luckenbill, suggested that Shammuramat ruled the empire for five years, from the death of her husband until 806 BC, as the text of the stele was interpreted as Adad-nirari stating that he "sat himself on the royal throne" and marched to Aramea only in 806 BC. However, the relevant term in this case, rabîš ašābu, interpreted by Luckenbill as "to become of age" or "to ascend the throne" more probably means something akin to "gloriously" or "magnificently" per other known uses of it in inscriptions.

It is possible that Shammuramat after a period of political prominence resigned and became a temple woman at one of the prominent temples in the empire, perhaps the Nabu temple in Kalhu where statues had previously been dedicated to her. Shammuramat probably died around c. 798 BC.

== Semiramis legend ==
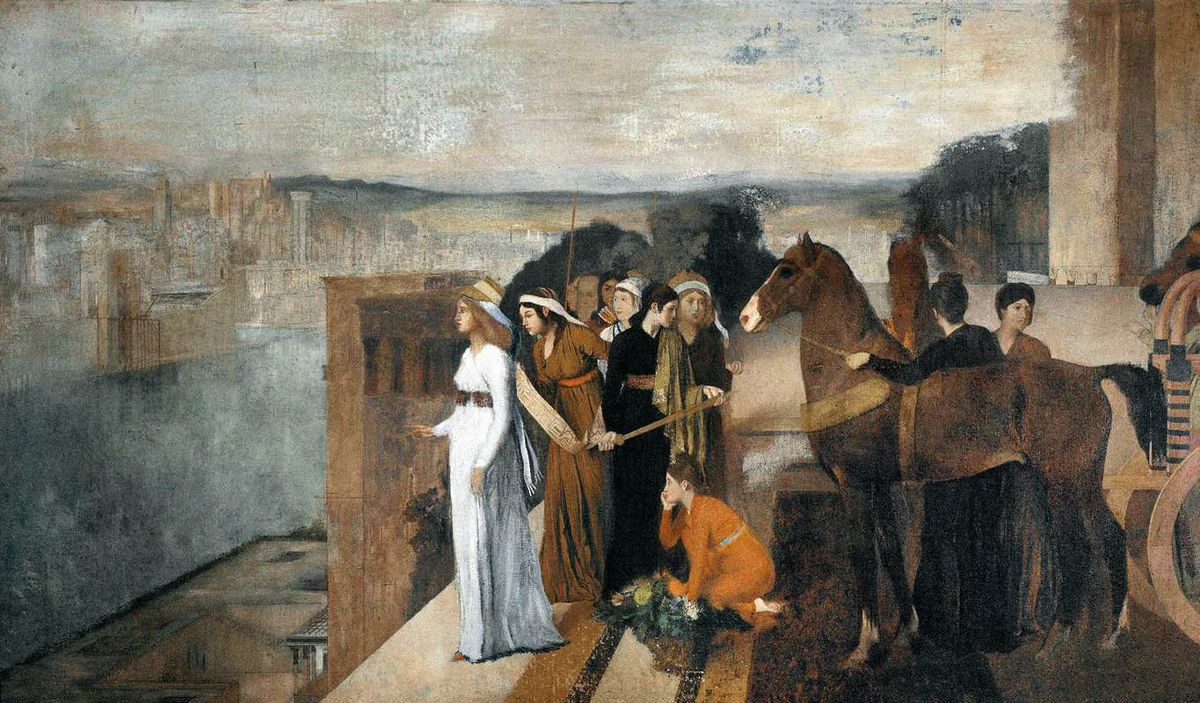
Semiramis Building Babylon (1861) by Edgar Degas

Shammuramat has long been recognized as the primary inspiration behind the legendary Assyrian warrior-queen and heroine Semiramis, though the Semiramis tradition likely also draws some inspiration from several other real and mythological figures of the ancient Near East, such as the later Assyrian consorts Atalia (wife of Sargon II) and Naqi'a (wife of Sennacherib). Though no cuneiform writings concerning the legend of Semiramis survive or have yet been discovered, it is believed to have originated as a native Assyrian Mesopotamian legend, only later finding its way into first Persian and then Greco-Roman literature. The legend is chiefly known today through the writings of Diodorus Siculus and the 5th-century BC historian Ctesias.

According to Ctesias, Semiramis was born in Ashkelon as the daughter of a Levantine mortal and the Greek goddess Derceto. Supposedly Derceto had been cursed to fall in love with the ordinary Levantine man as a result of angering Aphrodite. Though she gave birth to a daughter, Derceto was later ashamed of sleeping with the man and thus killed him and abandoned her daughter, throwing herself into a lake. This led her to transform into a mermaid-like creature. According to Ctesias, the inhabitants of Ashkelon and the rest of the Levant thereafter no longer ate fish, instead honoring them as gods. The baby Semiramis was kept alive through the aid of doves, who kept her warm with their wings and fed her until she was eventually found and adopted by a shepherd named Simmas. The connection of Semiramis to Ashkelon and the cult of fish is a perplexing one. In ancient Mesopotamia, the god Nabu was sometimes connected to fish and mermen and mermaids frequently figured as statues in his temples and as part of his iconography. Given that the temple dedication by Bel-tarṣi-ilumma which mentioned Shammuramat was concerning a temple of Nabu, a spurious connection could perhaps be drawn to the historical queen. It is possible that there was a cult of Nebo (the West Semitic version of the Assyrian-Babylonian Nabu) at Ashkelon but no evidence for this exists. Another inspiration for the tale, in particular Semiramis's connection to doves and Semiramis and her mother killing their lovers, could be Ishtar, the Mesopotamian goddess of love and war. The Assyrian and Babylonian queens were strongly connected to Ishtar in iconography. If Shammuramat resigned and became a temple woman it is also possible that this was the inspiration for later traditions designating her as a divine figure.

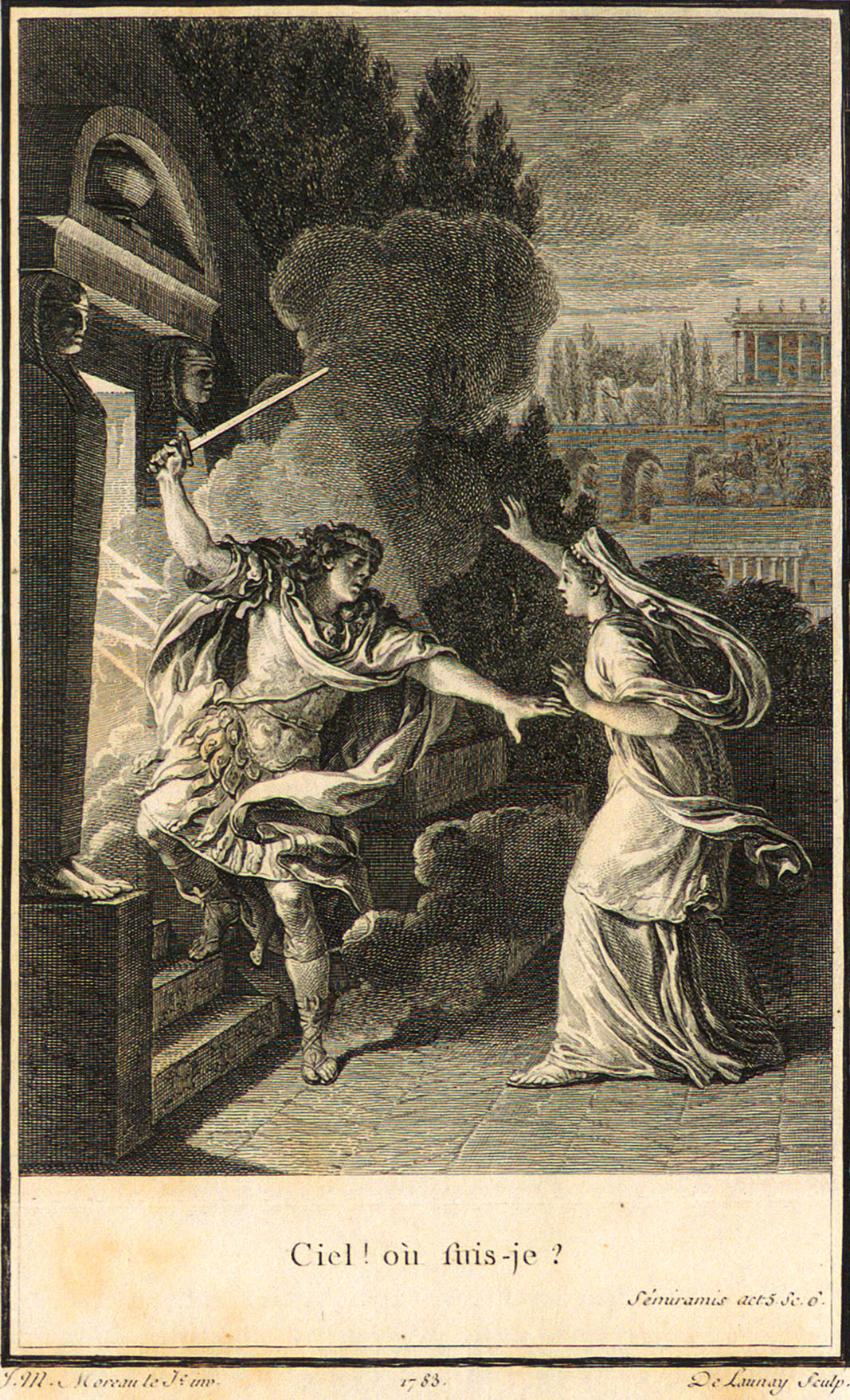
1784 illustration by Nicolas de Launay, depicting Semiramis being murdered by her son Ninyas

In almost all legends, Semiramis becomes the wife of Ninus (a purely legendary figure), a legendary founder of Nineveh and the Assyrian Empire and a figure who in virtually all stories he appeared in was overshadowed by his wife. Ctesias dated the time of Semiramis and the foundation of the Assyrian Empire to 2166 BC. In Ctesias's account, young Semiramis was first married to the Assyrian general Onnes, with whom she had two children. Onnes is described as fighting alongside Ninus in an attempt to capture the city of Bactra. When the siege drags on, he sends for his wife, who he misses dearly, a message Semiramis interprets as a call for military assistance. Thus, she equips herself for war and, using clothes and armor, masks her identity as a woman. As part of her equipment, Semiramis invented long-sleeved pants that intentionally masked the gender of the bearer, according to Ctesias the precursor of later pants popular among the Medes and Persians. Upon her arrival in Bactra, Semiramis proves to be a skilled warrior and succeeds in capturing the city, securing the admiration and attraction of Ninus. When Ninus threatens to blind Onnes due to Onnes refusing to relinquish his wife to him, Onnes hangs himself. After this, Semiramis becomes Ninus's wife. A king stealing a general's wife has parallels in Assyrian history; a letter of unknown date relates that an official revolted against the king due to the official's wife being taken into the royal harem.

Though described as fierce women evoking ancient Ishtar in Ctesias's account, both Semiramis and Dercerto were sometimes in later works transformed into almost unrecognizable figures. In the 1st-century BC Ninus Romance, Ninus and Semiramis are described as two star-crossed lovers who meet at a time when they are too young to marry. In this tale, Derceto, now called Derceia, is a caring mother who wishes to smooth the way for the romance and Semiramis is a tongue-tied, shy and weeping teenager.

In the accounts of Ctesias and Diodorus Siculus, Ninus is old at the time of their marriage and dies soon after the birth of their son Ninyas. The death of Ninus while Ninyas is still young leaves Semiramis to rule the empire. Semiramis erects a huge mound over Ninus's grave, using his bones to embellish Nineveh and turning his grave into a monument of her own strength and power. Later on, she constructs several more mounds to house the remains of generals, officials and her former lovers, sometimes buried alive. To rival Nineveh, founded by her husband, Semiramis is then credited with founding Babylon. Ctesias credits Semiramis with creating the Hanging Gardens of Babylon, though Diodorus Siculus attributes them a later king. Other than the baseless speculation that Shammuramat was of Babylonian origin, there is no evidence for any historical connection between Shammuramat and Babylon, nor of any building works being conducted in the city under Adad-nirari (who did not control Babylonia).

The Semiramis of legend is also described as leading military campaigns, for instance against both Armenia and India. The tale of Semiramis's conflict with Armenia could perhaps derive from remembrance of the campaigns of Adad-nirari, some of which were directed against Urartu (a precursor of Armenia). One of Adad-nirari's frequent foes was the Urartian king Argishti I, whose father Menua, a contemporary of Shammuramat, constructed a great canal which later on curiously at some point was named after Shammuramat as the Shamiram Canal. The Indian campaign, perhaps parallelling the Indian campaign of Alexander the Great, is described by Ctesias as Semiramis's only failure when she is forced to turn back after twice being injured by the Indian king. In several of the legends, including that of Ctesias, Semiramis's life comes to an end when she is killed by her son Ninyas, who is described as a weak man who avoided other men and warlike activities. According to the 2nd-century AD historian Justin, Ninyas killed Semiramis because she attempted to have sexual relations with him; accusations of sexual voracity were often flung in history on warrior women, due to their unusual position, and on widows. Some other late traditions accused Semiramis of having sex with a horse and committing suicide by burning herself alive. These negative portrayals have little to do with the more ancient versions of the legend, such as that of Ctesias, wherein Semiramis kills her lovers and never remarries out of fear of losing the throne.
