= Cephalion (historian) =

Cephalion (Ancient Greek: Κεφαλίων) was a Roman historian of the time of Hadrian. He wrote a History of Assyria from the time of Ninus and Semiramis to that of Alexander the Great. It was written in the Ionic dialect, and was divided into nine books, called by the names of the Muses; and as in this he aped Herodotus, so he is reported to have aimed at resembling Homer by concealing his birthplace. Hadrian banished him to Sicily where this work was composed.
