= Semiramis of the North =

Semiramis of the North is a designation given to some particularly capable female monarchs, after the legendary princess Semiramis of Assyria.

Queens called by this name include:

- Margaret I of Denmark (1353–1412)
- Christina of Sweden (1626–1689)
- Catherine II of Russia (1729–1796)
