= Ninus =

Mythical founder of Nineveh

- Νῖνος
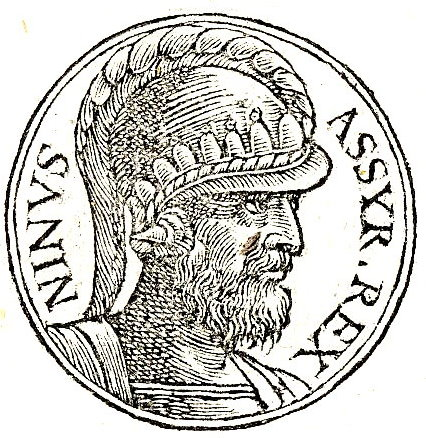
- Portrait from Promptuarium Iconum Insigniorum (1553) by Guillaume Rouillé
- Monuments: Nineveh
- Title: King of Assyria and Ruler of Mesopotamia and Asia.
- Predecessor: Belus or Arbelus
- Successor: Ninyas
- Spouse(s): Unknown (First wife); Semiramis (Second wife)
- Children: Trebeta, Ninyas
- Father: Belus

Ninus (Greek: Νίνος), according to Greek historians writing in the Hellenistic period and later, was the founder of Nineveh (also called Νίνου πόλις "city of Ninus" in Greek), ancient capital of Assyria. What figure or figures he may have been based on is uncertain; an identification with Shamshi-Adad I, Shamshi-Adad V, and/or a conflation of the two has been suggested.

== In Hellenic historiography ==
Many early accomplishments are attributed to Ninus, such as training the first hunting dogs, and taming horses for riding. For this accomplishment, he is sometimes represented in Greek mythology as a centaur.

The figures of King Ninus and Queen Semiramis first appear in the history of Persia written by Ctesias of Cnidus (c. 400 BC), who claimed, as court physician to Artaxerxes II, to have access to the royal historical records. Ctesias' account was later expanded on by Diodorus Siculus. Ninus continued to be mentioned by European historians (e.g. Alfred the Great), until knowledge of cuneiform enabled a more precise reconstruction of Assyrian and Babylonian history from the mid 19th century onwards.

He was said to have been the son of Belus or Bel, a name that may represent a Semitic title such as Ba'al, "lord" (the famous name of a "god" whom Elijah opposed in 1 Kings 17ff). According to Castor of Rhodes (apud Syncellus p. 167), his reign lasted 52 years, its commencement, according to Ctesias, corresponding to 2040 BC. He was reputed to have conquered the whole of western Asia in 17 years with the help of Ariaeus, king of Arabia, and to have founded the first empire, defeating the legendary kings Barzanes of Armenia (whom he spared) and Pharnus of Media (whom he had crucified, alongside his wife and his seven sons)

Ninus' Empire according to Diodoros

As the story goes, Ninus, having conquered all neighboring Asian countries apart from India and Bactriana, then made war on Oxyartes, king of Bactriana, with an army of, according to Ctesias, 1,700,000 foot-soldiers, 210,000 cavalry, and slightly less than 10,600 scythe-bearing chariots, taking all but the capital, Bactra. During the siege of Bactra, he met Semiramis, the wife of one of his officers, Onnes, whom he took from her husband and married. The fruit of the marriage was Ninyas, said to have succeeded Ninus.

Ctesias (as known from Diodorus) also related that after the death of Ninus, his widow Semiramis, who was rumored to have murdered Ninus, erected to him a temple-tomb, 9 stadia high and 10 stadia broad, near Babylon, where the story of Pyramus and Thisbe (Πύραμος; Θίσβη) was later based. She was further said to have made war on the last remaining independent monarch in Asia, king Stabrobates of India, but was defeated and wounded, abdicating in favour of her son Ninyas.

== Identifications ==
A number of historians, beginning with the Roman Cephalion (c. AD 120) asserted that Ninus' opponent, the king of Bactria, was actually Zoroaster (or first of several to bear this name), rather than Oxyartes.

Ninus was first identified in the Recognitions (part of Clementine literature) with the biblical Nimrod, who, the author says, taught the Persians to worship fire. In many modern interpretations of the Hebrew text of Genesis 10, it is Nimrod, the son of Cush, who founded Nineveh, though other translations (e.g., the KJV) render the same passage as naming Ashur, son of Shem, as the founder of Nineveh.

More recently, the identification in Recognitions of Nimrod with Ninus (and also with Zoroaster, as in Homilies) formed a major part of Alexander Hislop's thesis in the 19th century tract The Two Babylons.

== Historicity ==
The decipherment of a vast quantity of cuneiform texts has allowed modern Assyriologists to piece together a more accurate history of Sumer, Akkad, Babylonia, Assyria, and Chaldea as well as of the Levant, Anatolia and Ancient Iran. Ninus (like Nimrod) is not attested in any of the far older extensive king lists compiled by the Mesopotamians themselves, nor mentioned in any Mesopotamian literature, and is thus considered wholly fictional.

An Assyrian queen Shammuramat is known to be historical, and for five years from 811 BC ruled the Neo-Assyrian Empire as regent for her son Adad-nirari III, and had been the wife of Shamshi-Adad V, rather than having any connection to the fictional Ninus. The later Hellenic myths surrounding Semiramis are considered by some to be inspired by the novelty of a woman ruling what was the largest empire in history at that point.

== In culture ==
The story of Ninus and Semiramis is narrated in a 1st-century AD Hellenistic romance called the Ninus Romance, the Novel of Ninus and Semiramis, or the Ninus Fragments. A scene from it is perhaps depicted in mosaics from Antioch on the Orontes.

In his 7th-century compendium, the Etymologiae, Isidore of Seville claimed that idolatry was the invention of Ninus, who had a gold statue made of his father Belus, which he worshipped. This claim was highly influential throughout the medieval period into the Early Modern.

Ninus allegedly invented warfare, armaments, and the war-chariot.

Two major works from late-16th-century England refer to Ninus in passing. William Shakespeare's A Midsummer Night's Dream has the story of Pyramus and Thisbe as a play-within-a-play. The actors constantly mispronounce the location "Ninus' Tomb" as "Ninny's Tomb," though they are corrected initially, and in vain, by "director" Peter Quince. At the same time, Edmund Spencer's epic poem The Faerie Queene refers to Ninus’ pride in Canto V, verse XLVIII:

And after him old Ninus farre did pas
In princely pompe, of all the world obayd
There also was that mightie Monarch layd
Low under all, yet above all in pride

In 1846 London, the Italian opera Nabucco by Giuseppe Verdi and Temistocle Solera was rewritten as Nino due to British censorship; to avoid depicting Biblical scenes, the enslaved Hebrews under Babylonian King Nebuchadnezzar were changed to enslaved Babylonians under Assyrian Emperor Ninus.

== Sources ==
- Chisholm, Hugh, ed. (1911). "Ninus" . Encyclopædia Britannica (11th ed.). Cambridge University Press.
- Full account in Diodorus
