= Kızkapanlı, Pazarcık =

Village in Kahramanmaraş Province, Turkey

Kızkapanlı
- Neighbourhood
- Location in Turkey
- Coordinates: 37°22′34″N 37°17′32″E
- Country: Turkey
- Province: Kahramanmaraş
- District: Pazarcık
- Population (2022): 502
- Time zone: UTC+3 (TRT)

Kızkapanlı is a neighbourhood in the municipality and district of Pazarcık, Kahramanmaraş Province, Turkey. The village is inhabited by Kurds of the Atma tribe and had a population of 502 in 2022.

== Archaeology ==
The Pazarcık Stele was found here. It is an Assyrian monument comprising a boundary stone that was erected by the Assyrian king Adad-nirari III in 805 BC to demarcate the border between the kingdoms of Kummuh and Gurgum.
