= Barzanes of Armenia =

Legendary Armenian monarch

Barzanes (Ancient Greek: Βαρζάνης), son of Sabatius, was a fictional king said to have been one of the early monarchs of the Kingdom of Armenia. His name and story appear in the works of several mostly Greek writers during the Hellenistic period, such as the 5th century BCE writer Ctesias and the 1st century BCE historian Diodorus Siculus.

According to the Babyloniaca of Babylonian writer Berossus, Barzanes succeeded the first Armenian ruler, a "Scytha". Pre-modern writers wrote that Barzanes was himself deposed when Ninus invaded Armenia, annihilating some Armenian cities. Barzanes perceived Ninus's superior army, and propitiated Ninus with lavish gifts. Ninus allowed him to continue as a vassal.

Since modern scholars have been able to piece together a more confident and accurate history of the kings of the region, and know with certainty that Ninus is a fictional, not historical, figure, it is certain that Barzanes is likewise fictional.
