= Euphrates Tunnel =

Legendary tunnel under the river Euphrates

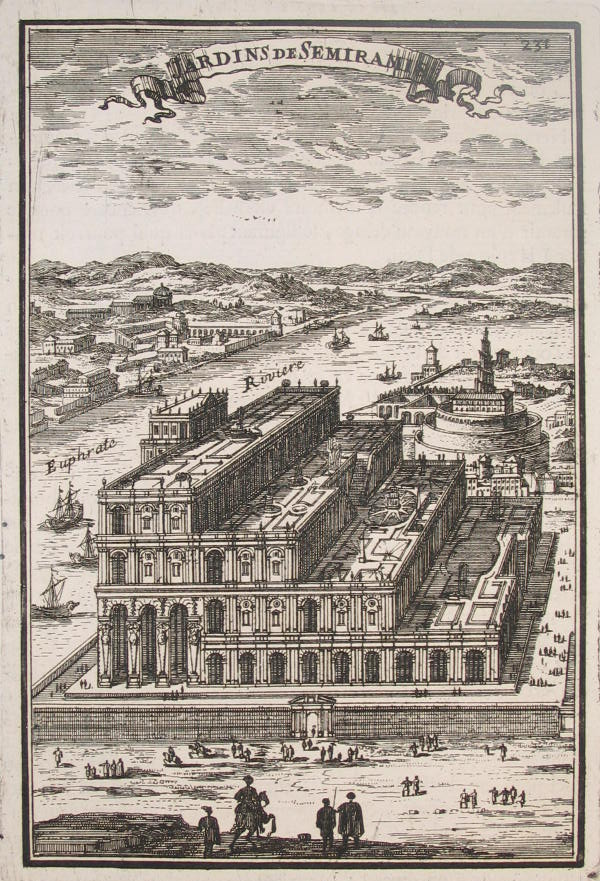
- The gardens of Semiramis, in front of Euphrates river (Alain Manesson Mallet, Description de L'Univers, 1683)
- Interactive map of Euphrates Tunnel

Overview
- Location: Babylon
- Coordinates: 32.5363°N 44.4150°E
- Status: No longer extant; possibly mythical
- Start: East shore of Euphrates in Babylon
- End: West shore of Euphrates in Babylon

Operation
- Owner: Semiramis

Technical
- Line length: 929 metres (0.577 mi)

The Euphrates Tunnel was a legendary tunnel purportedly built under the river Euphrates to connect the two halves of the city of Babylon in Mesopotamia.

The first tunnel known definitively to have been built underwater was the Thames Tunnel, completed in 1841.

== History ==
A description of the tunnel as being built and used by Queen Semiramis is given by Diodorus (fl. 50 BCE) in the Bibliotheca Historica:

"After all these in a low ground in Babylon, she sunk a place for a pond, four-square, every square being three hundred furlongs in length, lined with brick, and cemented with brimstone, and the whole five-and-thirty feet in depth: into this having first turned the river, she then made a passage in form of a vault, from one palace to another, whose arches were built of firm and strong brick, and plaistered all over on both sides with bitumen, four cubits thick. The walls of this vault were twenty bricks in thickness, and twelve feet high, beside and above the arches; and the breadth was fifteen feet. This piece of work being finished in two hundred and sixty days, the river was turned into its antient channel again, so that the river flowing over the whole work, Semiramis could go from one palace to the other, without passing over the river. She made likewise two brazen gates at either end of the vault, which continued to the time of the Persian empire."

— Diodorus, Bibliotheca Historica, Book II,1 (Translation by G. Booth, 1814)

Philostratus (d. 250 CE) also describes the tunnel's construction in the Life of Apollonius of Tyana:

"And [Babylon] it is cut asunder by the river Euphrates, into halves of similar shape; and there passes underneath the river an extraordinary bridge which joins together by an unseen passage the palaces on either bank. For it is said that a woman, Medea, was formerly queen of those parts, who spanned the river underneath in a manner in which no river was ever bridged before; for she got stones, it is said, and copper and pitch and all that men have discovered for use in masonry under water, and she piled these up along the banks of the river. Then she diverted the stream into lakes; and as soon as the river was dry, she dug down two fathoms, and made a hollow tunnel, which she caused to debouch into the palaces on either bank like a subterranean grotto; and she roofed it on a level with the bed of the stream. The foundations were thus made stable, and also the walls of the tunnel; but as the pitch required water in order to set as hard as stone, the Euphrates was let in again on the roof while still soft, and so the junction stood solid".

— Philostratus of Athens, Life of Apollonius of Tyana, book I,25. (Translation by F.C Conybeare, 1912)

== Construction ==
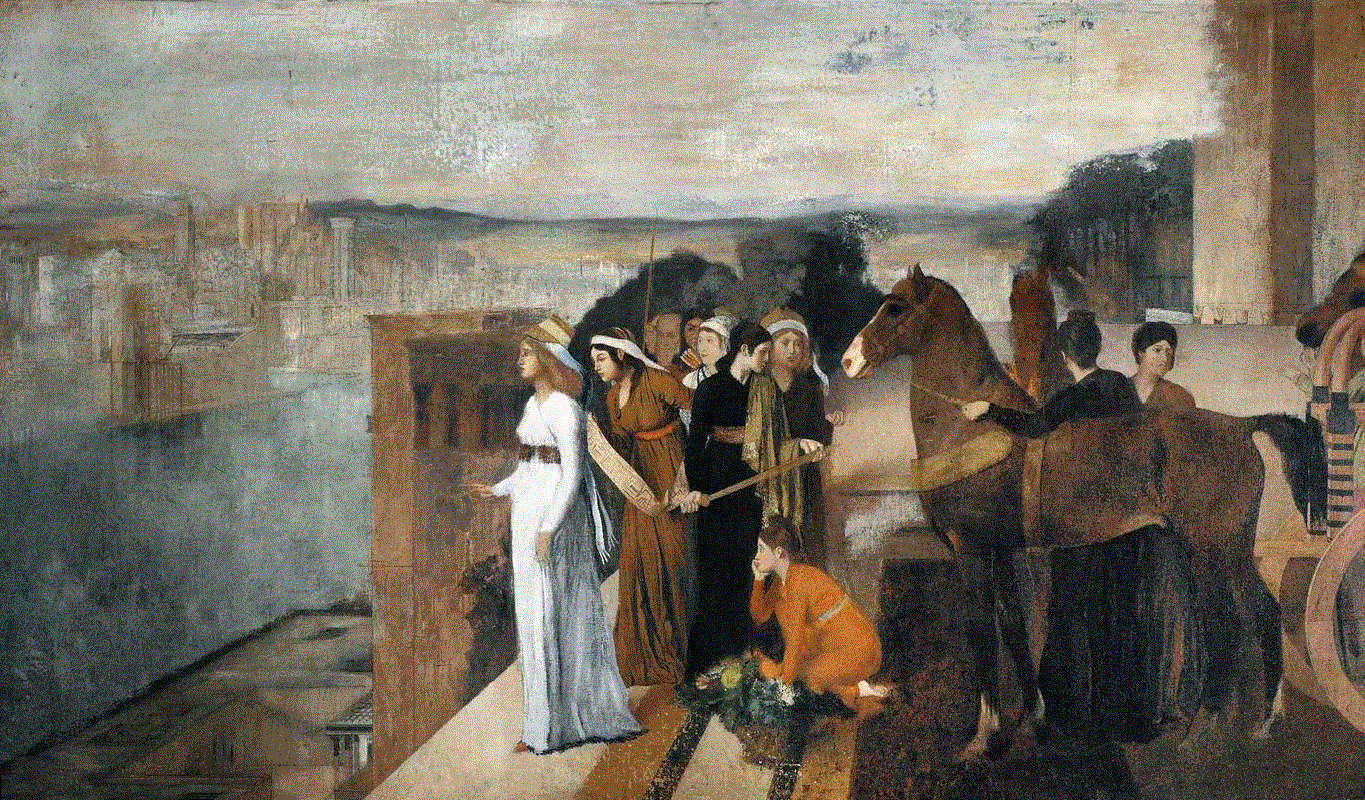
Mythological scene showing the Euphrates

Construction allegedly began with a temporary dam across the Euphrates, and proceeded using a "cut and cover" technique.

The tunnel allegedly spanned 12 feet (3.7 m) high and 15 feet (4.6 m) wide. It is presumed that it was used by pedestrians and horse driven chariots and connected a major temple with the royal palace on the other shore of the river. It was supposedly lined with brick and waterproofed with asphalt.
