= Pazarcık Stele =

Ancient Assyrian monument

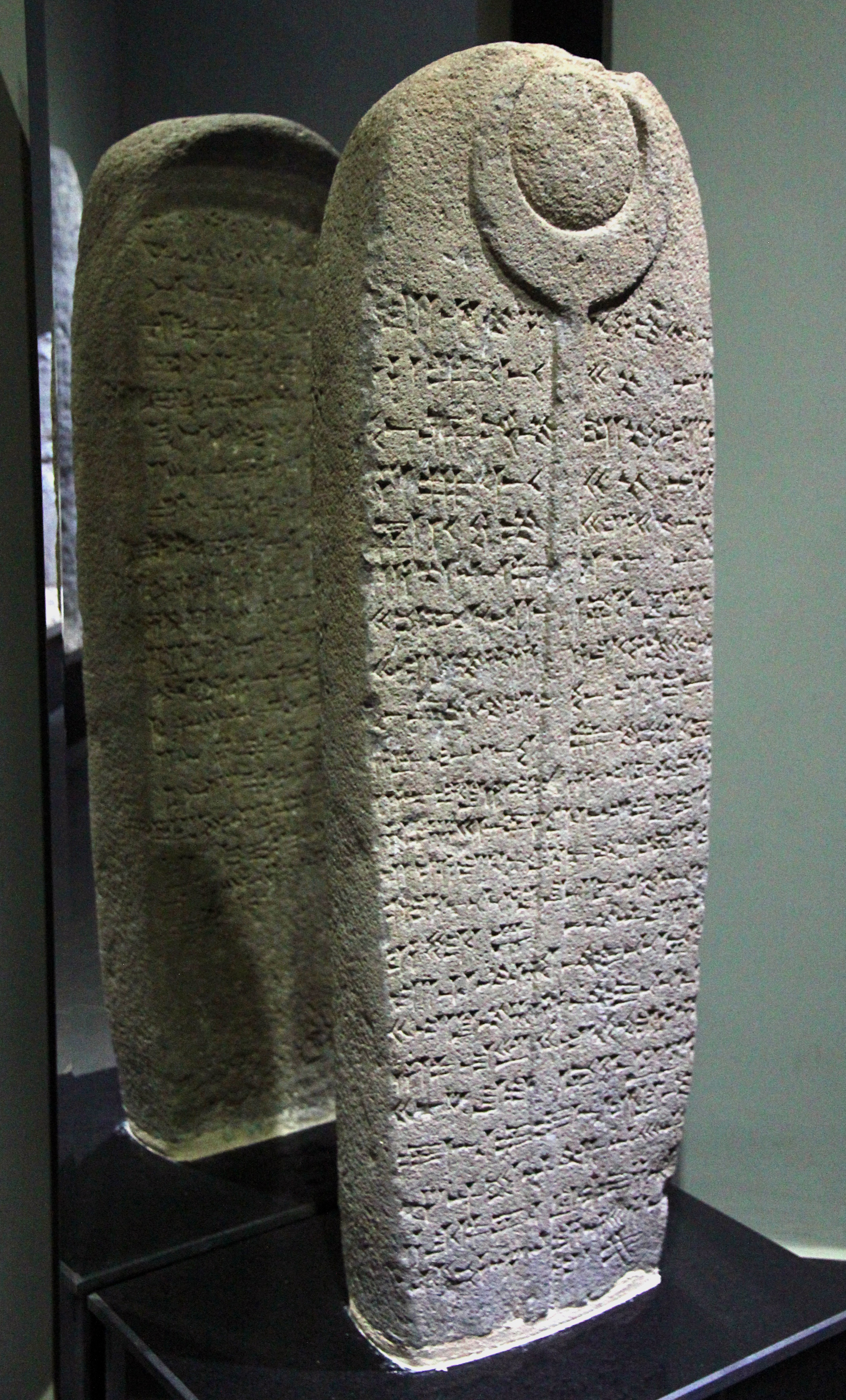
Pazarcık Stele

The Pazarcık Stele is an Assyrian monument which functioned as a boundary stone erected by the Assyrian king Adad-nirari III in 805 BC to demarcate the border between the kingdoms of Kummuh and Gurgum. The reverse and obverse of the stele have been inscribed in the Akkadian language in different times.

== Description ==
The stele was found at Kizkapanli, Pazarcik village, about 30km southeast from the city of Kahramanmaraş in Turkey. The location spot is about halfway between the modern cities of Kahramanmaraş and Gaziantep.

It is preserved in its entirety, and it is 140 centimetres (55 in) high, 44 centimetres (17 in) wide and 16.5 centimetres (6.5 in) thick. Its front side is covered with an inscription of King Adad-nirari III (810–783 BC), while the back side is covered with an inscription of king Shalmaneser IV (782–773 BC) that was added later.

The monument is housed at the Kahramanmaraş Archaeology Museum.

=== Karaçay stele ===
A similar stele, known as the 'Karaçay/Pazarcık Stele of Storm God', has been found in this area as well. It was found in 1969 during the construction of the irrigation regulator in Karaçay village of Pazarcık.

The Karaçay stele was dated to the 8th century BC by Bunnens. But some of its elements may indicate a much earlier period, similar to the Tell Ahmar stelae. So it may be dated to the middle 9th century BC.

== Border dispute ==
In 805 BCE, as reported on the Pazarcık Stele, Kummuh king Ušpilulume (Šuppiluliuma) asked for the assistance of the Assyrian king Adad-nirari III against the a coalition of eight kings led by Atarshumki I of Arpad, Syria. Adad-nirari apparently travelled with his mother Šammuramat, defeated the alliance at Paqarhubuna, and established the border between Kummuh and Gurgum at Pazarcık.

In 773 BCE, the same boundary was re-established by Assyrian general (turtanu) Šamši-ilu acting on behalf of Assyrian king Shalmaneser IV.

=== Antakya stele ===
Antakya stele is another similar stele from the same time. It settles another border dispute, the territorial conflict between the kings Atarshumki I of Arpad, and Zakkur of Hamath, and it was also set up in the name of Adad-Nirari III and Shamshi-ilu.

Atarshumki I is mentioned in both of these stelae. According to Hawkins, Antakya stele should be dated 9 years later in 796 BC, and Ataršumki, the former enemy of Assyria, is now the beneficiary of the Assyrian arbitration.

== Biblical reference ==
The stela also mentions the name of Hezyon, king of Damascus. According to the inscription, the general of Shalmaneser IV Šamši-ilu received a rich tribute from him.

Hezyon (Hezion) of Damascus is mentioned in 1 Kings 15-18 in connection with king Asa of Judah. But, in the Bible, king Asa sends the tribute to Ben-Hadad I, the grandson of Hezion. So this may be another Hezion, since these biblical events refer to the 9th century.
