= Onnes (general) =

Legendary Assyrian general

Onnes in legend was one of the generals of the mythological Assyrian king Ninus. He married Semiramis. He is said to have committed suicide, after which his widow married Ninus.
