= Semiramis =

Legendary queen of Assyria

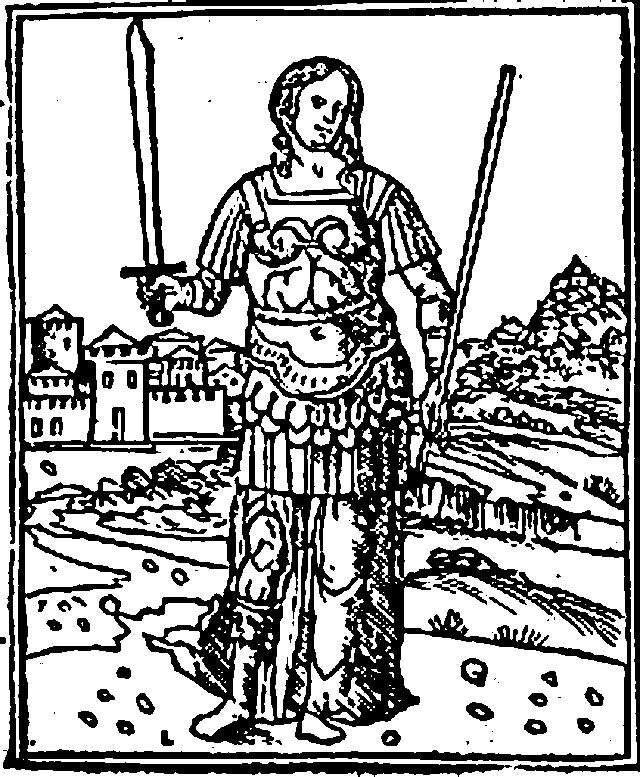
Semiramis, a legendary figure based on the life of Shammuramat, depicted as an armed Amazon in an eighteenth-century Italian illustration

Semiramis (/səˈmɪrəmɪs, sɪ-, sɛ-/ (Note: Semiramis in Greek: Σεμίραμις, Syriac: ܫܲܡܝܼܪܵܡ Šammīrām, Armenian: Շամիրամ Šamiram, Arabic: سميراميس Samīrāmīs)) was the legendary Lydian-Babylonian wife of Onnes and of Ninus, who succeeded the latter on the throne of Assyria, according to Movses Khorenatsi. Legends narrated by Diodorus Siculus, who drew primarily from the works of Ctesias of Cnidus, describe her and her relationships to Onnes and King Ninus.

Armenians and the Assyrians of Iraq, northeast Syria, southeast Turkey, and northwest Iran still use Shamiram and its derivative Samira as a given name for girls.

The real and historical Shammuramat, the original Akkadian form of the name, was the Assyrian wife of Shamshi-Adad V (ruled 824–811 BC). She ruled the Neo-Assyrian Empire as its regent for five years, before her son Adad-nirari III came of age and took the reins of power. She ruled at a time of political uncertainty, which may partly explain why Assyrians may have accepted the rule of a woman when it was not allowed by their cultural tradition. She conquered much of the Middle East and the Levant and stabilized and strengthened the empire after a destructive civil war. It has been speculated that being a woman who ruled successfully may have made the Assyrians regard her with particular reverence and that her achievements may have been retold over the generations until she was gradually turned into a legendary figure.

The name of Semiramis came to be applied to various monuments in Western Asia and Anatolia whose origins had been forgotten or unknown, even the Behistun Inscription of Darius. Herodotus ascribes to her the artificial banks that confined the Euphrates. He knew her name because it was inscribed on a gate of Babylon. Various places in Mesopotamia, Media, Persia, the Levant, Anatolia, the Arabian Peninsula, and the Caucasus received names recalling Semiramis.

== Historical figure ==
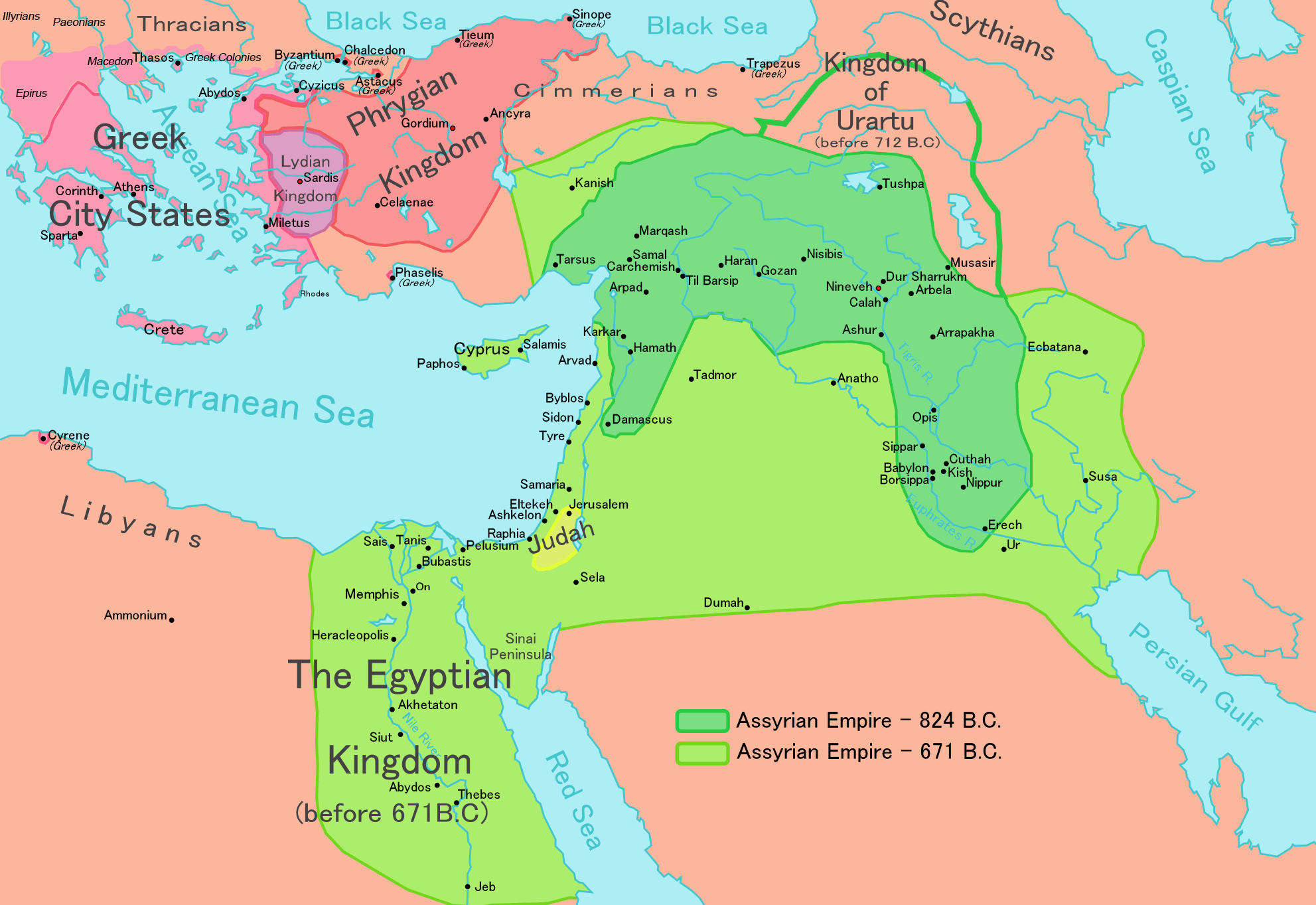
The approximate area controlled by Assyria in 824 BC, (darker green)

While the achievements of Semiramis are clearly in the realm of mythical Persian, Armenian, and Greek historiography, the historical Shammuramat certainly existed. After her husband's death, she might have served as regent for her son, Adad-nirari III. Thus, during that time Shammuramat could have been in control of the vast Neo-Assyrian Empire (911–605 BC), which stretched from the Caucasus Mountains in the north to the Arabian Peninsula in the south, and from western Iran in the east to Cyprus in the west.

In the city of Aššur on the Tigris, she had an obelisk built and inscribed that read, "Stele of Shammuramat, queen of Shamshi-Adad, King of the Universe, King of Assyria, Mother of Adad Nirari, King of the Universe, King of Assyria, Daughter-in-Law of Shalmaneser, King of the Four Regions of the World."

== Legend according to Diodorus Siculus ==
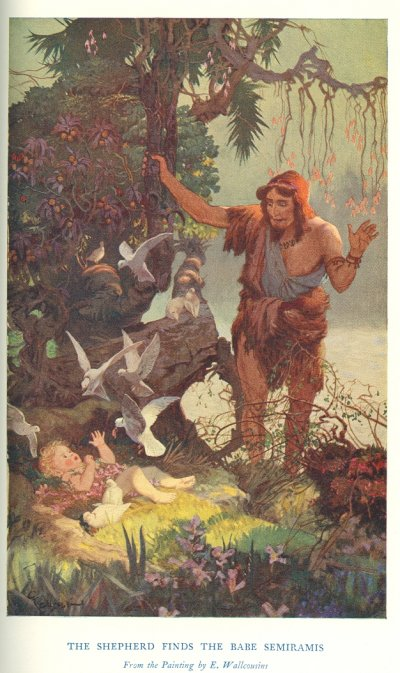
The Shepherd finds the Babe Semiramis by Ernest Wallcousins, 1915

According to Diodorus, a first century BC Greek historian, Semiramis was of noble parents, the daughter of the fish-goddess Derketo of Ascalon and of a mortal. He related that Derketo abandoned her at birth and drowned herself. Doves fed the child until she was one year old. Then the doves, who had started pecking off bits from the cheeses to feed her, caught the attention of some keepers. These found the baby, and brought her to Simmas, the royal shepherd, who adopted her as his own, and gave her the name Semiramis, which according to Diodorus is a slight alteration of the Syrian word for dove. Semiramis married Onnes or Menones, a general under King Ninus, and she became an advisor to the king. Her advice led him to great successes. At the Siege of Bactra, she personally led a party of soldiers to seize a key defensive point, leading to the capture of the city.

Ninus was so struck that he fell in love with her. He tried to compel Onnes to give her to him as a wife, first offering his own daughter Sonanê in return and eventually threatening to put out his eyes as punishment. Out of fear of the king, and out of doomed passion for his wife, Onnes "fell into a kind of frenzy and madness" and hanged himself. Ninus then married Semiramis.

Diodorus relates that after their marriage, Semiramis and Ninus had a son named Ninyas. After King Ninus conquered Asia, including the Bactrians, Ninus was fatally wounded by an arrow. Semiramis disguised herself as her son so the army would follow her instructions, thinking they came from their new ruler. Diodorus writes that her reign lasted for 42 years and that she conquered much of Asia and achieved many feats. She restored ancient Babylon and protected it with a high brick wall that completely surrounded the city. She built several palaces in Persia, including Ecbatana.

She ruled Asia effectively and added Libya and Aethiopia to the empire. When she heard that India was the largest country in the world, she went to war with King Stabrobates (Supratika) of India, having her artisans build an army of military dummies in the form of false elephants by putting manipulated skins of dark-skinned buffaloes over her camels to deceive the Indians into thinking she had acquired real elephants. This ploy succeeded initially, but she was wounded in the counterattack and her army mainly annihilated, which forced the surviving remnants to re-ford the Indus and retreat to the west.

Diodorus mistakenly attributed the Behistun Inscription to her; it is now known to have been produced by Darius the Great. Diodorus could be referring to the nearby Anubanini rock relief which shows the goddess Ishtar dragging captives towards King Anubanini, he may have mistaken Ishtar for Semiramis and Anubanini for Ninus. The writings of Diodorus about Semiramis are strongly influenced by the writings of Ctesias of Cnidus, although his writings about Semiramis do not always follow those by Ctesias.

== Other ancient traditions ==
[...]Here are other three
Whose love was evil: and Semiramis,
Byblis, and Myrrha are oppressed with shame
For their unlawful and distorted love."

— Petrarch's Triumphs, Canto III, lines 75 to 78

Legends describing Semiramis have been recorded by approximately 80 ancient writers including Plutarch, Eusebius, Polyaenus, Valerius Maximus, Orosius, and Justinus. She was associated with Ishtar and Astarte since the time before Diodorus. The association of the fish and dove is found at Hierapolis Bambyce (Mabbog, now Manbij), the great temple that according to one legend, was founded by Semiramis, where her statue was shown with a golden dove on her head.

The name of Semiramis came to be applied to various monuments in Western Asia and Anatolia, the origins of which ancient writers sometimes asserted had been forgotten or unknown. Various places in Assyria and throughout Mesopotamia as a whole, Media, Persia, the Levant, Anatolia, the Arabian Peninsula, and the Caucasus bore the name of Semiramis in slightly changed forms, even some named during the Middle Ages. She is credited with founding the city of Van in Turkey in order to have a summer residence and that city may be found referred to as Shamiramagerd (city of Semiramis).

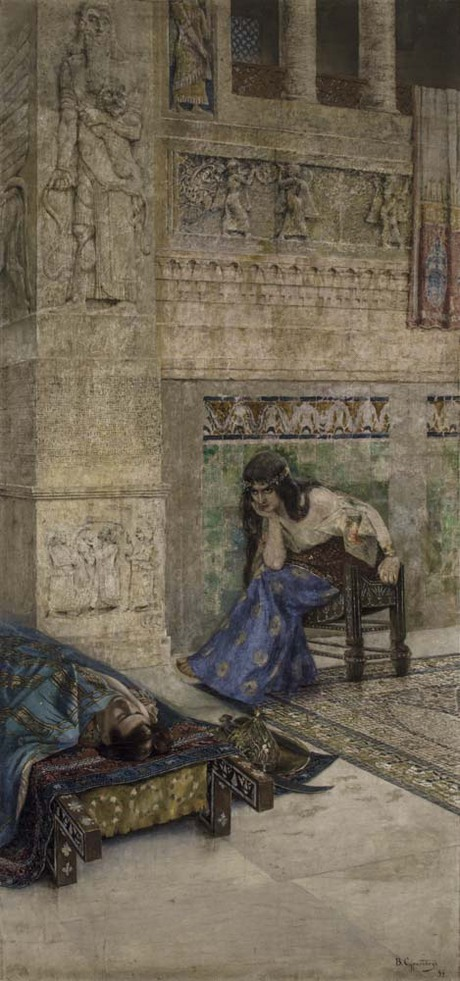
Semiramis staring at the corpse of Ara the Handsome, 1899, by Vardges Sureniants

Herodotus, an ancient Greek writer, geographer, and historian living from c. 484 to 425 BC, ascribes to Semiramis the artificial banks that confined the Euphrates and knows her name as borne by a gate of Babylon. Strabo, a Greek geographer, philosopher, and historian who lived in Asia Minor during 64 or 63 BC to 24 AD, credits her with building earthworks and other structures "throughout almost the whole continent". Nearly every stupendous work of antiquity by the Euphrates or in Iran seems to have been ascribed to Semiramis, even the Behistun Inscription of Darius.

The 2nd century strategist and rhetoritician Polyaenus writes of Semiramis, saying that when she heard that the Siraces were revolting against her, while she was in the bath; she immediately got out of the bath and took the field without waiting to have her sandals put on or her hair dressed. According to Polyaenus, there were pillars recounting her in these words: “Nature made me a woman, but I have raised myself to rivalry with the greatest of men. I swayed the sceptre of Ninus; and extended my dominions to the river Hinamames on the east; on the south, to the country which is fragrant with the production of frankincense and myrrh; and northward to the Saccae and Sogdians. No Assyrian before me ever saw the sea; but distant as the seas are from here, I have seen four. And to their proud waves who can set bounds? I have directed the course of rivers at my will; and my will has directed them where they might prove useful. I have made a barren land produce plenty, and fertilised it with my rivers. I have built walls which are impregnable; and with iron forced a way through inaccessible rocks. At great expense I have formed roads in places, which before not even the wild beasts could traverse. And great and various as my exploits have been, I have always found leisure hours, in which to indulge myself and my friends."

Roman historian Ammianus Marcellinus (c. 330 – c. 400), who wrote the penultimate major historical account surviving from antiquity, credits her as the first person to castrate a male youth into eunuch-hood: "Semiramis, that ancient queen who was the first person to castrate male youths of tender age".

Armenian tradition portrays Semiramis negatively, possibly because of a victorious military campaign she waged against them. One of the most popular legends in Armenian tradition involves Semiramis and an Armenian king, Ara the Handsome. According to that legend, Semiramis had fallen in love with the handsome Armenian King Ara and asked him to marry her. When he refused, in her passion she gathered the armies of Assyria and marched against Armenia.

During the battle Semiramis was victorious, but Ara was slain despite her orders to capture him alive. This legend continues that to avoid continuous warfare with the Armenians, Semiramis, who they alleged was a sorceress, took his body and prayed to deities to raise Ara from the dead. When the Armenians advanced to avenge their leader, she disguised one of her lovers as Ara and spread the rumor that the deities had brought Ara back to life, reportedly convincing the Armenians not to continue the war. According to John of Antioch (Historian), Ctesias wrote that Semiramis buried some of her lovers alive.

In one persistent tradition in this vein, the prayers of Semiramis are successful and Ara returns to life. During the nineteenth century, it was reported that a village called Lezk, near Van in Turkey, traditionally held that it was the location of the resurrection of Ara.

In paragraph XXII of Julius Caesar, Suetonius also mentioned her in a response to Caesar's statement that in the future senators would be submissive to his pleasure, writing "One of the senators observing, sarcastically: "That will not be very easy for a woman to do," he jocosely replied, "Semiramis formerly reigned in Assyria, and the Amazons possessed great part of Asia."

Procopius wrote that asphalt was Semiramis's pride.

According to Hyginus, Semiramis killed her husband Ninus, and when she lost her horse, she threw herself on the pyre. Pliny the Elder wrote that Semiramis once fell in love with a horse and married it.

Semiramis is said by Plutarch to have prepared a great tomb for herself, with an inscription reading "Whatsoever king finds himself in need of money may break into this monument and take as much as he wishes." When Darius the Great broke into her tomb, however, he found no money, but instead another inscription: "if you were not a wicked man with an insatiate greed for money, you would not be disturbing the places where the dead are laid."

== In later traditions ==
She is Semiramis, of whom we read
That she succeeded Ninus, and was his spouse;
She held the land which now the Sultan rules."

— Dante's Divine Comedy, Canto V, lines 60 to 62

Although negative portrayals did exist, generally, Semiramis was viewed positively before the rise of Christianity. During the Middle Ages, she became associated with promiscuity and lustfulness. One story claimed that she had an incestuous relationship with her son, justified it by passing a law to legitimize parent-child marriages, and invented the chastity belt to deter any romantic rivals before he eventually killed her. This seems to have appeared first in the reign of Augustus in the Universal History of Pompeius Trogus, which survives only in the later epitome of Justin; the circulation of the story was likely popularized in the fifth century by Orosius in his universal history, Seven Books of History Against the Pagans, which has been described as an "anti-pagan polemic".

The sixth-century historian John Malalas has an account of Semiramis, mixing her with Rhea wife of Kronos; in this version, she is both the wife and mother of Ninus.

In the Divine Comedy (Inferno V), Dante places Semiramis among the souls of the lustful in the Second Circle of Hell. She appears in Petrarch's Triumph of Love (canto III, verse 76). She is one of three women exemplifying "evil love", the other two being Byblis and Myrrha.

She is included in De Mulieribus Claris, a collection of biographies of historical and mythological women by the Florentine author Giovanni Boccaccio that was composed in 1361–1362. It is notable as the first collection devoted exclusively to biographies of women in Western literature. in the book, she is described as a crossdresser, who impersonated her son, as she was the same height as her son, and had a similar face to his. To ensure that nothing in the process would expose the fraud, she covered her head with a tiara and hid her arms and legs with robes. Since this was unusual for the Assyrians at the time, she ordered that all people use similar attire, so that the novelty of the habit would not cause wonder among the neighbors. Mimicking her son (though she was Ninus’s former wife) and pretending to be a boy, she obtained royal majesty with marvelous diligence. She is also described as having had sex with her son. Fearing that she might be cheated of her son’s embrace by the women of the household, she first devised the use of breeches and bound all the court women in them in the palace. This account is also found in the much older Epitome of the Pompeius Trogus, where Semiramis is also described as a crossdresser, who pretended to be the son of her husband, Ninus, so that she wouldn't have to hand government over to her young son. "The stature of both mother and son was low, their voice alike weak, and the cast of their features similar. 3 She accordingly clad her arms and legs in long garments, and decked her head with a turban; and, that she might not appear to conceal anything by this new dress, she ordered her subjects also to wear the same apparel; a fashion which the whole nation has since retained. Having thus dissembled her sex at the commencement of her reign, she was believed to be a male."

The 9th century Arab historian Al-Masudi mentioned Semiramis in his work, saying that her empire stretched from the banks of the Tigris to the borders of Armenia, into Azerbaijan, reaching the limits of the Jazira region, Mount Judi, Mount Titel, the land of Zawzan, and other parts of Armenia, and that she relentlessly waged war against Mosul during her 40 year reign. According to Masudi, she was succeeded by a son named "Al-Arsis".

In his Chronology of Ancient Nations, Al-Biruni reports a legend, which makes Semiramis a man named Shamirus, "one of the kings of Babel", who fought with Dhul Qarnayn, who imprisoned and killed him, and stripped off the skin of his head together with his hair and his two curls, got it tanned, and used it as a crown, which gave him the name "two horned one". Later on, Biruni reports that this "Shamirus" reigned for 72 years.

Her reputation partly recovered in the late Middle Ages and Renaissance. She was included in Christine de Pizan's The Book of the City of Ladies, finished by 1405, and, starting in the fourteenth century, she was commonly found on the Nine Worthies list for women.

Isaac Newton placed her as living 166 years before Nitocris of Babylon, (this is the year 760 B.C) as he viewed this as lining up with Herodotus's statement of "five generations".

Semiramis appears in the private revelation of Anne Catherine Emmerich entitled Life of Jesus Christ and Biblical Revelations. She is said to be "...the offspring of demoniacs, apt at everything save the working out of her salvation." She is described as tall, powerful, mighty, inconceivably bold, fierce, shameless and [she] carried out with astonishing assurance whatever the Evil One had showed [her] in visions. Semiramis is also described as an oppressor and "dissolute", looked upon as goddess of the chase by her nation. Emmerich relates: "...Semiramis I saw upon a lofty mountain surrounded by all the kingdoms and treasures of the world, as if Satan were showing them to her, giving them to her." She is later described as a contemporary of Job and is seen hunting the Behemoth and planning the first pyramid.

== Literary references ==
Semiramis appears in many plays, such as Voltaire's tragedy Sémiramis and Pedro Calderón de la Barca's drama La hija del aire, and in operas by dozens of composers including Nicola Porpora, Antonio Vivaldi, Christoph Willibald Gluck, Domenico Cimarosa, Josef Mysliveček, Giacomo Meyerbeer, and the most famous, Semiramide by Gioachino Rossini. Arthur Honegger composed music for Paul Valéry's 1934 "ballet-pantomime" Semiramis, which was revived in 1992 after many years of neglect.

In Eugène Ionesco's play The Chairs, the Old Woman character is referred to as Semiramis.

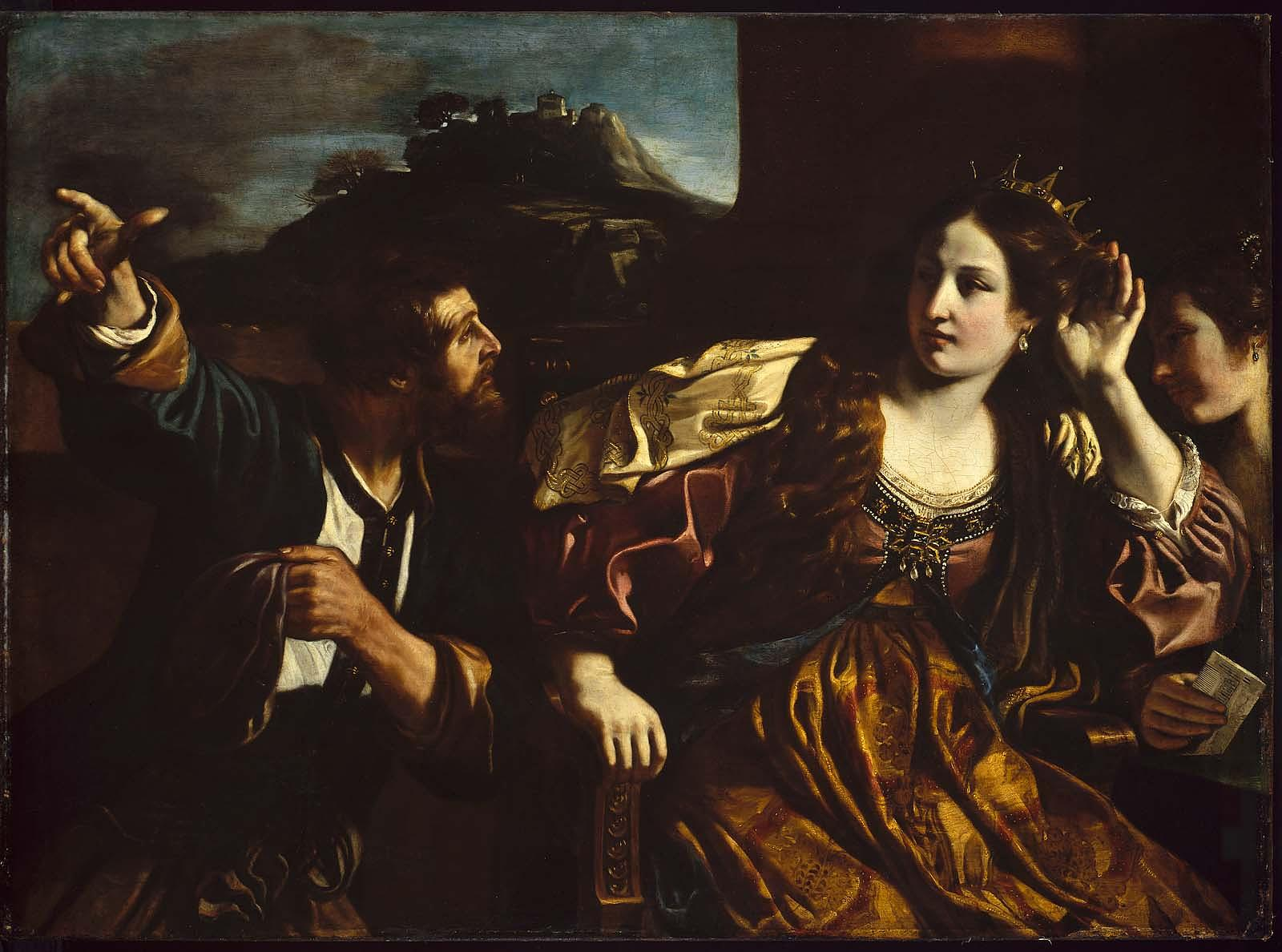
Semiramis hearing of the insurrection at Babylon by Giovanni Francesco Barbieri, 1624, Museum of Fine Arts, Boston

Semiramis was mentioned by William Shakespeare in Titus Andronicus (II.1) and The Taming of the Shrew (Ind.2). Portrayal of Semiramis has been used as a metaphor for female rulership. Sometimes she was referenced during political disputes regarding rule by women, both as an unfavorable comparison, for example, against Elizabeth I of England, and as an example of a woman who governed well. Powerful female monarchs Margaret I of Denmark and Catherine the Great were given the designation Semiramis of the North.

The mother of the sultan in "The Man of Law's Tale" in Geoffrey Chaucer's Canterbury Tales is compared to Semiramis, with the intention of suggesting that the mother of the sultan is an evil woman just like Semiramis.

In the twentieth century, Semiramis has appeared in several sword and sandal films. She was portrayed by Rhonda Fleming in Queen of Babylon (1954) and by Yvonne Furneaux in I am Semiramis (1963).

== The Two Babylons ==
Despite a lack of supporting evidence in the Bible, the book The Two Babylons (1853), by the Christian minister Alexander Hislop, was particularly influential in characterizing Semiramis as the Whore of Babylon. Hislop claimed that Semiramis invented polytheism and, with it, goddess worship. He claimed that the head of the Catholic Church inherited and continued to propagate a millennia-old secret conspiracy, founded by Semiramis and the Biblical king Nimrod, to propagate the pagan religion of ancient Babylon.

Hislop asserted that Semiramis was a queen consort and the mother of Nimrod, builder of the Bible's Tower of Babel. He claimed that Semiramis and Nimrod's incestuous male offspring was the Akkadian deity Tammuz and that all divine pairings in religions were retellings of this story. These claims are still circulated among some evangelical Protestants, in the form of Jack Chick tracts, comic books, and related media.

Lester L. Grabbe has claimed that Hislop's argument, particularly his identification of Ninus with Nimrod, is based on a misunderstanding of historical Babylon and its religion. Grabbe criticized Hislop for portraying Semiramis as Nimrod's consort, despite that she has not been found in a single text associated with him, and for portraying her as the "mother of harlots", even though this is not how she is depicted in any of the historical texts where she is mentioned. Ralph Woodrow also has been critical of this interpretation and has stated that Alexander Hislop "picked, chose and mixed" portions of various myths from different cultures.

== In modern culture ==
- The Semiramis InterContinental Hotel in Cairo is named after her. It is where the Cairo Conference of 1921 took place and was presided over by Winston Churchill.
- Semiramis appears in the Japanese light novel and anime series Fate/Apocrypha of the Fate franchise as the Assassin of Red. She also appears in the mobile game of the same franchise, Fate/Grand Order.
- Semiramis is an Italian progressive rock band who produced one LP, Dedicato a Frazz (1973).
- Semiramis is mentioned in the Malice Mizer song "Illuminati" (1998), as is Nimrod.
- "Queen Semiramis" is the name of a composition by Iraqi composer Raed George.
- Semiramis is mentioned in the 1010Benja song "Semiramis' Dream" (2026).
- In John Myers Myers' 1949 novel Silverlock, Semiramis appears as a lustful, commanding queen, who stops her procession to try to seduce young Lucius, who has been transformed into a donkey.
- Christopher C. Doyle's The Secret of the Druids (2017), the third book in the Mahabharata Secret trilogy, depicts Semiramis as the estranged daughter of powerful Indian king Sthabarpati, who attacks her father's kingdom in pursuit of amrita (nectar). When she learns her son has conspired against her, she abdicates her throne and moves to Ireland, where she is revered as a goddess.
- In Costanza Casati's novel Babylonia, Semiramis is the main character. The book is about Semiramis's rise to power, from humble beginnings to the great throne of the Assyrian Empire.
- Semiramis appears as a Secondary Antagonist in the Xbox 360 game Dantes Inferno

== See also ==
- Euphrates Tunnel
- 584 Semiramis, a large minor planet orbiting the sun

== Bibliography ==
=== Primary sources ===
- Paulinus Minorita, Compendium
- Eusebius, Chronicon 20.13–17, 19–26 ( Schoene pp.53–63 )
- Orosius, Historiae adversus paganos i.4, ii.2.5, 6.7
- Justinus, Epitome Historiarum philippicarum Pompei Trogi i.2
- Valerius Maximus, Factorum et dictorum memorabilium libri ix.3, ext 4

=== Secondary sources ===
- Beringer, A. 2016. The Sight of Semiramis: Medieval and Early Modern Narratives of the Babylonian Queen. Tempe: Arizona State University Press.
- Dross-Krüpe, K. 2020. Semiramis, de qua innumerabilia narrantur. Rezeption und Verargumentierung der Königin von Babylon von der Antike bis in die opera seria des Barock Wiesbaden: Harrassowitz.
