= Dibekli =

Dibekli can refer to:

- Dibekli, Ağın
- Dibekli, Ayvacık
- Dibekli, Gümüşhane
- Dibekli, Hınıs
