= Ağın Bridge =

Bridge over the Keban Lake in the Elazığ Province in Turkey

Ağın Bridge Ağın Köprüsü
- Coordinates: 38.9155°N 38.6630°E
- Crosses: Lake Keban Dam
- Locale: Ağın, Elazığ Province
- Other name(s): Ağın (Karamağara) Bridge

Characteristics
- Design: Cable-stayed bridge
- Material: Steel
- Total length: 520 m (1,710 ft)
- Width: 13 m (43 ft)
- Longest span: 280 m (920 ft)
- Clearance above: 55 m (180 ft)

History
- Constructed by: MEGA YAPI
- Construction start: 2001
- Construction cost: ₺ 33.325 million
- Opened: October 26, 2015

The Ağın Bridge, a.k.a. Ağın (Karamağara) Bridge, (Turkish: Ağın Köprüsü or Ağın Karamağara Köprüsü) is a cable-stayed bridge spanning Lake Keban in Elazığ Province, Turkey. It was opened to traffic in 2015.

The construction of the bridge began in 2001. Due to alterations to the project, construction was delayed, but work resumed on January 10, 2012, and the opening took place on October 26, 2015. The bridge was built by the Mega Yapi company and the consultant was BOTEK Bosphorus Technical Consulting Corporation.

The cable-stayed bridge is 520 m (1,710 ft) long and 13 m (43 ft) wide with a main span of 280 m (920 ft), and a clearance of 55 m (180 ft) above the water level. The bridge carries one lane of traffic in each direction. At its opening, the Ağın Bridge became Turkey's fourth longest one after the Bosphorus Bridge, 1,560 m (5,120 ft), and Fatih Sultan Mehmet Bridge, 1,510 m (4,950 ft), in Istanbul and the Nissibi Euphrates Bridge, 610 m (2,000 ft), in Adıyaman Province. The budgeted cost of the construction was given as ₺ 33.325 million.

== Background ==
In the past, access to the town of Ağın from the city of Elazığ was provided by the Karamağara Bridge, an ancient Roman arch bridge situated about 10 km (6.2 mi) from the town. The historic bridge was dismantled, and its ashlar masonry was moved to the Elazığ Museum before the Keban Dam was completed and its reservoir created in 1974. For a period of about 40 years following the establishment of the reservoir, the town was disconnected from the provincial center, and was accessible only by ferry boats across the lake. The newly built bridge is also named the "Ağın (Karamağara) Bridge" in remembrance of the previous Roman bridge which no longer exists.
