= Bahadırlar =

Bahadırlar can refer to:

- Bahadırlar, Ağın
- Bahadırlar, Çal
