= Sheridan Square Apartments =

- U.S. National Register of Historic Places
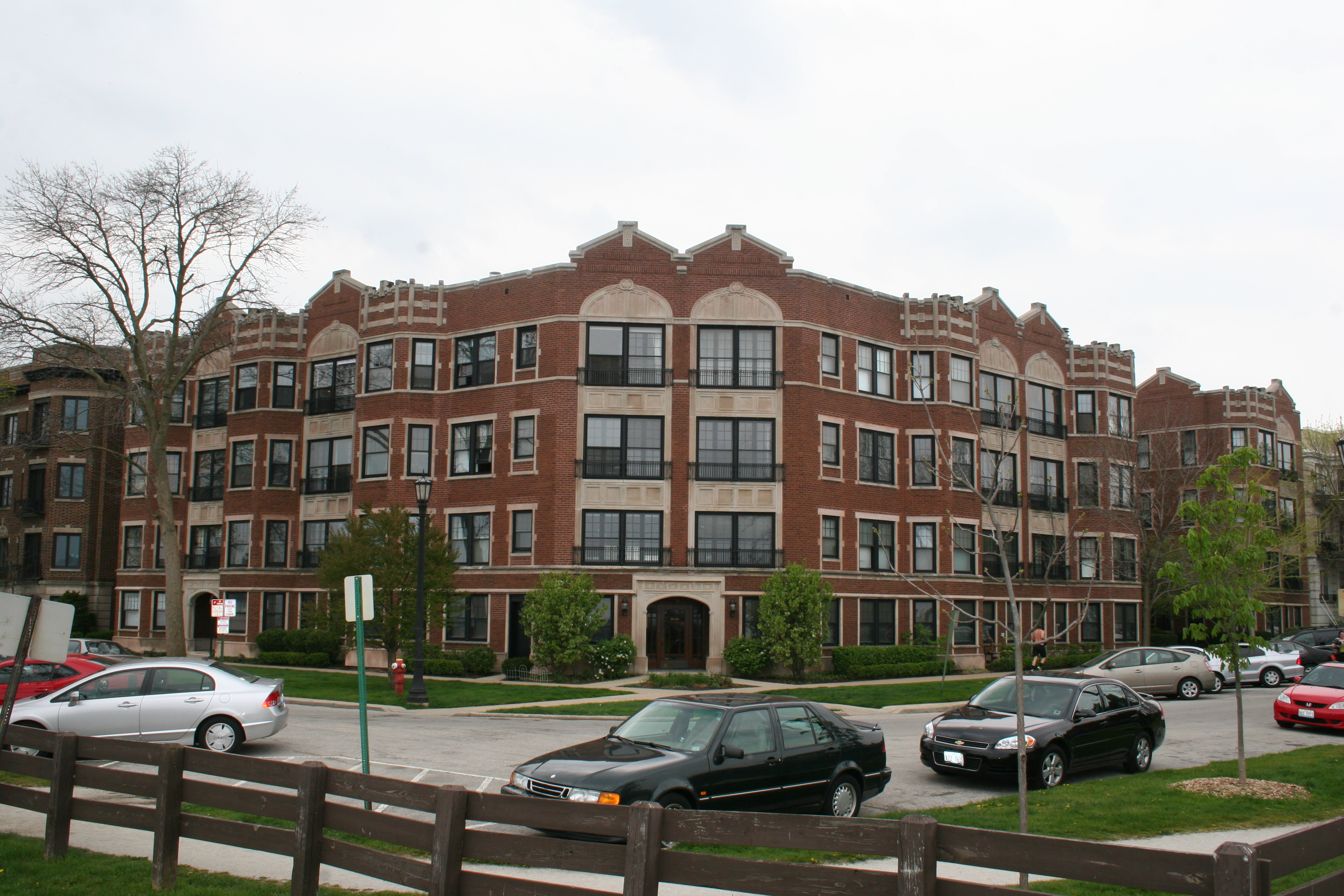
- Sheridan Square Apartments in 2012

- Location within Chicago metropolitan area Location within Illinois Location within the United States
- Location: 620-638 Sheridan Sq., Evanston, Illinois
- Coordinates: 42°01′44″N 87°40′11″W
- Area: 0.4 acres (0.16 ha)
- Built: 1924
- Architect: Anthony Quitsow
- Architectural style: Tudor Revival
- MPS: Suburban Apartment Buildings in Evanston TR
- NRHP reference No.: 84001050
- Added to NRHP: March 15, 1984

Sheridan Square Apartments is a historic apartment building at 620-638 Sheridan Square in Evanston, Illinois. The three-story brick building was built in 1924. The building has an S-shaped layout which wraps around a corner and features an open courtyard. Architect Anthony Quitsow designed the building in the Tudor Revival style. The building's design features Gothic arched entrances, French windows with limestone spandrels, limestone banding near the roof, and several double gables facing the street.

The building was added to the National Register of Historic Places on March 15, 1984.
