= Ağın =

- Municipality
- Location within Turkey
- Coordinates: 38°56′32″N 38°42′56″E
- Country: Turkey
- Province: Elazığ
- District: Ağın

Government
  - Mayor: Yılmaz Serttaş (MHP)
- Population (2021): 1,818
- Time zone: UTC+3 (TRT)
- Postal code: 23960
- Climate: Csa
- Website: www.agin.bel.tr

Ağın is a town of Elazığ Province of Turkey. It is the seat of Ağın District. Its population is 1,818 (2021). The mayor is Yılmaz Serttaş from the Nationalist Movement Party.

== History ==
The city of Ağın was initially founded by Armenians who had migrated there from Iran. In 1896, the city was evenly divided between Muslims and Armenians. The city was recognized for its wealth and had previously escaped the 1895-1896 Hamidian massacres through a ransom payment by the Armenians of 1500 Turkish gold pounds.

On September 15, 1896, three weeks after the raid of the Ottoman Bank by Armenian Dashnaks as a response to the Hamidian massacres, Turkish authorities organized a new massacre in the city of Ağın. Ottoman troops killed "upwards of 2000 Armenians" including "many women and children" according to a report by the French Ambassador. Of the 1500 houses located in the Armenian quarter of Ağın, 980 were pillaged and burned. According to a report by the British Consul at Harput, the pretext used to attack the city's Armenian quarter was that the Armenians of the said city were "set to cause trouble". The same report by the Consul said that there was no revolutionary movement whatsoever and no powder magazine exploded during the massacre. A few pistols and revolvers were found in the ruins of the burnt houses.

== Access ==
Access to Ağın from the province center Elazığ was provided in the past by Karamağara Bridge, a Roman arch bridge in 10 km (6.2 mi) distance spanning the Arapgir Creek. The bridge was dismantled, and its ashlar were moved to Elazığ Museum when the flooding of the Keban Dam reservoir began in 1974. Ağın was accessible only by ferryboat over a period of forty years before the Ağın Bridge was built and opened to traffic in 2015. The newly built bridge is also named the "Ağın (Karamağara) Bridge" in remembrance of the non-existing old bridge.

== Quarters ==
The town Ağın consists of the following quarters:

- Akpınar
- Başpınar
- Merkez
- Şenpınar
