= Pulköy, Ağın =

Village in Turkey

Pulköy
- Village
- Location in Turkey
- Coordinates: 39°01′N 38°41′E
- Country: Turkey
- Province: Elazığ
- District: Ağın
- Population (2021): 54
- Time zone: UTC+3 (TRT)

Pulköy is a village in the Ağın District of Elazığ Province in Turkey. Its population is 54 (2021).
