= Bademli, Ağın =

Village in Turkey

Bademli
- Village
- Location in Turkey
- Coordinates: 39.0072°N 38.6691°E
- Country: Turkey
- Province: Elazığ
- District: Ağın
- Population (2021): 30
- Time zone: UTC+3 (TRT)

Bademli is a village in the Ağın District of Elazığ Province in Turkey. Its population is 30 (2021).
