= Yedibağ, Ağın =

Village in Turkey

Yedibağ
- Village
- Location in Turkey
- Coordinates: 38°54′N 38°38′E
- Country: Turkey
- Province: Elazığ
- District: Ağın
- Population (2021): 100
- Time zone: UTC+3 (TRT)

Yedibağ is a village in the Ağın District of Elazığ Province in Turkey. Its population is 100 (2021).
