= Modanlı =

Village in Turkey

- Village
- Location in Turkey
- Coordinates: 38.933°N 38.604°E
- Country: Turkey
- Province: Elazığ
- District: Ağın
- Population (2021): 50
- Time zone: UTC+3 (TRT)

Modanlı is a village in the Ağın District of Elazığ Province in Turkey. Its population is 50 (2021).
