= Öğrendik, Ağın =

Village in Turkey

Öğrendik
- Village
- Location in Turkey
- Coordinates: 39°00′N 38°42′E
- Country: Turkey
- Province: Elazığ
- District: Ağın
- Population (2021): 39
- Time zone: UTC+3 (TRT)

Öğrendik is a village in the Ağın District of Elazığ Province in Turkey. Its population is 39 (2021).
