= Beyelması, Ağın =

Village in Turkey

Beyelması
- Village
- Location in Turkey
- Coordinates: 38°58′N 38°42′E
- Country: Turkey
- Province: Elazığ
- District: Ağın
- Population (2021): 85
- Time zone: UTC+3 (TRT)

Beyelması is a village in the Ağın District of Elazığ Province in Turkey. Its population is 85 (2021).
