= Balkayası, Ağın =

Village in Turkey

Balkayası
- Village
- Location in Turkey
- Coordinates: 38°56′N 38°36′E
- Country: Turkey
- Province: Elazığ
- District: Ağın
- Population (2021): 36
- Time zone: UTC+3 (TRT)

Balkayası is a village in the Ağın District of Elazığ Province in Turkey. Its population is 36 (2021).
