= Samançay, Ağın =

Village in Turkey

Samançay
- Village
- Location in Turkey
- Coordinates: 38°59′09″N 38°39′25″E
- Country: Turkey
- Province: Elazığ
- District: Ağın
- Population (2021): 34
- Time zone: UTC+3 (TRT)

Samançay is a village in the Ağın District of Elazığ Province in Turkey. Its population is 34 (2021).
