= Kaşpınar, Ağın =

Village in Turkey

Kaşpınar
- Village
- Location in Turkey
- Coordinates: 38°55′34″N 38°43′12″E
- Country: Turkey
- Province: Elazığ
- District: Ağın
- Population (2021): 26
- Time zone: UTC+3 (TRT)

Kaşpınar is a village in the Ağın District of Elazığ Province in Turkey. Its population is 26 (2021).
