= Demirçarık, Ağın =

Village in Turkey

Demirçarık
- Village
- Location in Turkey
- Coordinates: 38°55′N 38°39′E
- Country: Turkey
- Province: Elazığ
- District: Ağın
- Population (2021): 24
- Time zone: UTC+3 (TRT)

Demirçarık is a village in the Ağın District of Elazığ Province in Turkey. Its population is 24 (2021).
