= Saraycık, Ağın =

Village in Turkey

Saraycık
- Village
- Location in Turkey
- Coordinates: 38°51′23″N 38°39′15″E
- Country: Turkey
- Province: Elazığ
- District: Ağın
- Population (2021): 227
- Time zone: UTC+3 (TRT)

Saraycık is a village in the Ağın District of Elazığ Province in Turkey. Its population is 227 (2021). The village is populated by Kurds of the Milan tribe.
