= Yenipayam, Ağın =

Village in Turkey

Yenipayam
- Village
- Location in Turkey
- Coordinates: 38°57′N 38°40′E
- Country: Turkey
- Province: Elazığ
- District: Ağın
- Population (2021): 54
- Time zone: UTC+3 (TRT)

Yenipayam is a village in the Ağın District of Elazığ Province in Turkey. Its population is 54 (2021).
