= Ağın District =

- District
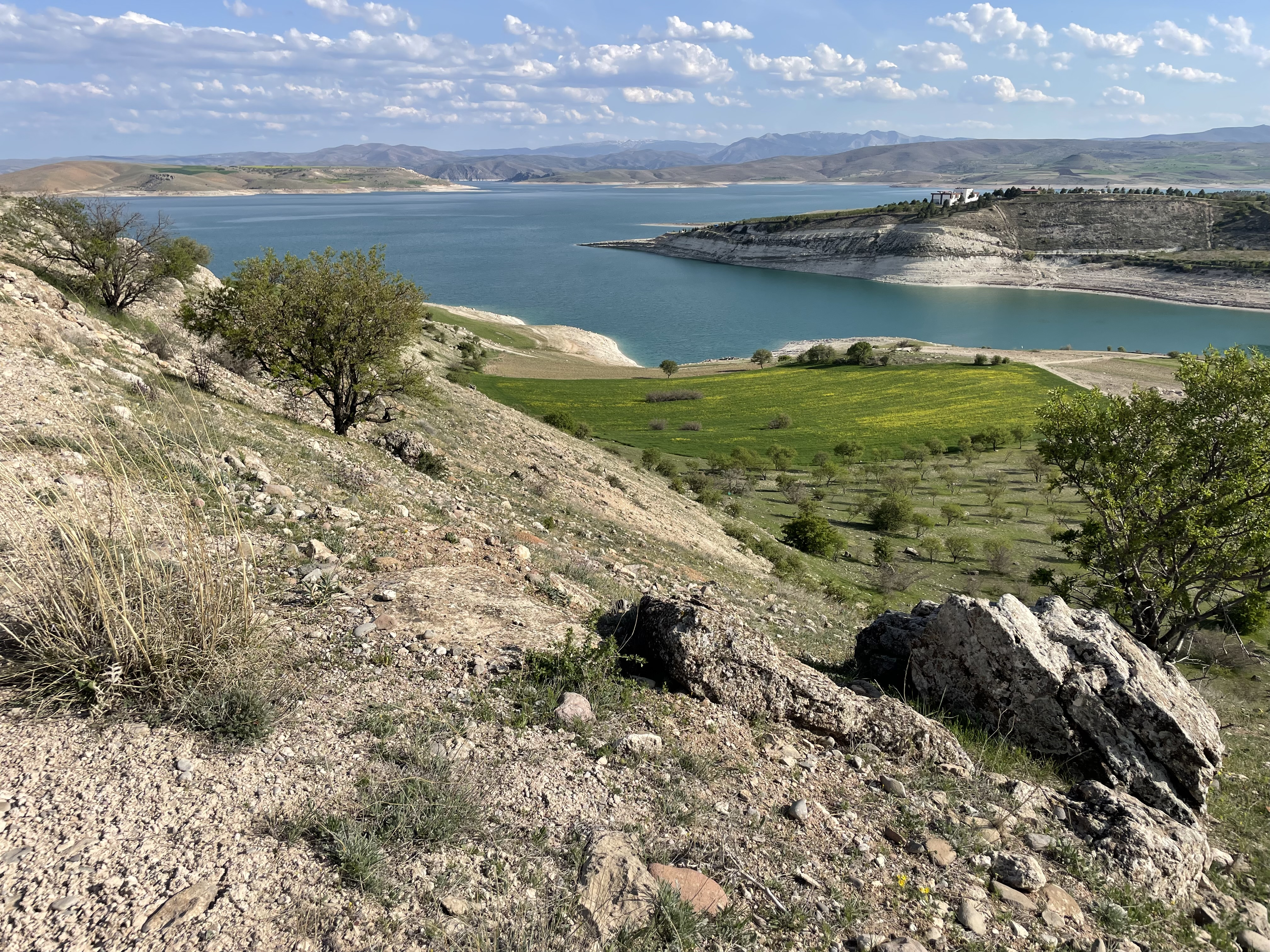
- Euphrates River, Ağın

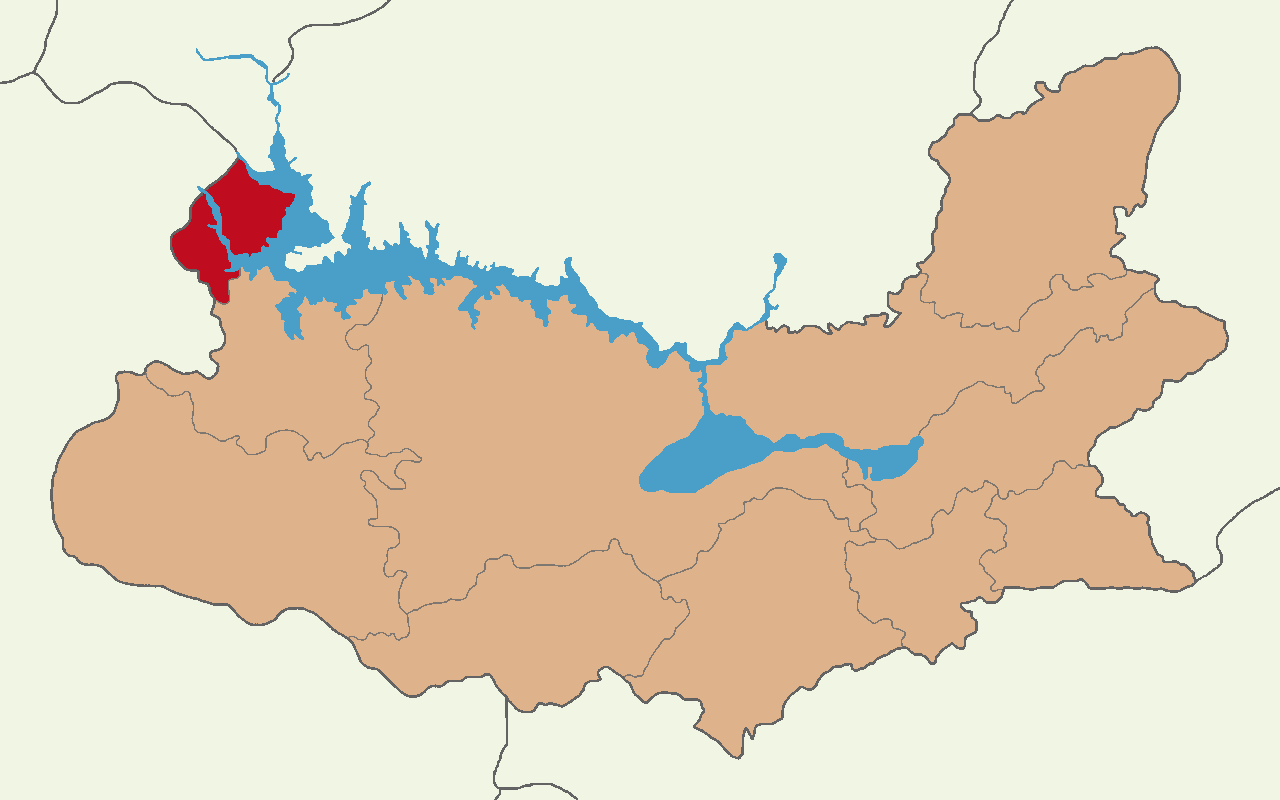
- Map showing Ağın District in Elazığ Province

- Location within Turkey
- Coordinates: 38°57′N 38°43′E
- Country: Turkey
- Province: Elazığ
- Seat: Ağın

Government
  - Kaymakam: Levent Yetgin
- Area: 242 km^{2} (93 sq mi)
- Population (2021): 2,746
  - Density: 11.3/km^{2} (29.4/sq mi)
- Time zone: UTC+3 (TRT)

Ağın District is a district of Elazığ Province of Turkey. Its seat is the town Ağın. Its area is 242 km^{2}, and its population is 2,746 (2021). The district was established in 1954.

== Composition ==
There is 1 municipality in Ağın District:

- Ağın

There are 16 villages in Ağın District:

- Altınayva
- Aşağıyabanlı
- Bademli
- Bahadırlar
- Balkayası
- Beyelması
- Demirçarık
- Dibekli
- Kaşpınar
- Modanlı
- Öğrendik
- Pulköy
- Samançay
- Saraycık
- Yedibağ
- Yenipayam

== Demographics ==
The district with the exception of Saraycık village is populated by Turks. Saraycık is populated by Kurds. There are moreover a couple of Alevi villages in the district.
