= Altınayva, Ağın =

Village in Turkey

Altınayva
- Village
- Location in Turkey
- Coordinates: 38°54′N 38°36′E
- Country: Turkey
- Province: Elazığ
- District: Ağın
- Population (2021): 52
- Time zone: UTC+3 (TRT)

Altınayva is a village in the Ağın District of Elazığ Province in Turkey. Its population is 52 (2021).
