= Karamagara Bridge =

Submerged bridge in Turkey

- The single pointed arch of 17 m span
- Coordinates: 38.924961°N 38.658486°E
- Carries: Roman road to Melitene
- Crosses: Arapgir Çayı
- Locale: Near Ağın, Elazığ Province, Eastern Anatolia region, Turkey

Characteristics
- Design: Pointed arch bridge
- Material: Stone
- Longest span: 17 m
- No. of spans: 1

History
- Construction end: 5th or 6th century AD

The Karamagara Bridge (Turkish: Karamağara Köprüsü, "Bridge of the Black Cave") is a Byzantine or late Roman bridge in the ancient region of Cappadocia in eastern Turkey, and possibly the earliest known pointed arch bridge.

The bridge, along with much of the Arapgir Çayı valley, has been submerged since the completion of the Keban Dam in 1975, as a result of which the water level in the Euphrates valley and some of its upstream tributaries dramatically rose.

== Location and situation ==
The single arch of 17 m spans between the cliffs of the rocky gorge of the Arapgir Çayı, an affluent of the Euphrates.

The structure belonged to the Roman road to Melitene, which was cut into the rock near the bridge at both sides of the river. Its name Karamağara ("black cave") probably derives from an artificially widened cavern on the southern bank which was carved into the darkish rock 75 m above the structure and served for protection of the crossing point. The bridge was quite frequently mentioned by early European travellers.

As with other monuments in the region, the site was examined by the Middle East Technical University of Ankara prior to its flooding. Further downstream, at the village of Bahadın, the remains of another now submerged Roman bridge may indicate the existence of an older crossing point.

== Pointed arch ==
The pointed arch rib was built without mortar between the voussoirs. On its eastern, downstream side a nearly intact Christian inscription in Greek runs along most of its length, citing almost verbatim Psalm 121, verse 8 of the Bible. The text reads:

Κύριος ὁ Θεὸς φυλ[ά]ξει τὴν εἰσοδ[όν] σου κε τὴν ἐ[ξ]οδόν σου ἀπὸ τοῦ νῦν καὶ ἔως τοῦ αἰῶνος, ἀμὴ[ν], ἀμ[ὴν], ἀ[μὴν].
Kýrios ho Theós phyláxei tēn eisodón sou ke tēn exodón sou apó tou nyn kai héōs tou aiṓnos, amḗn, amḗn, amḗn.
[The] Lord God may guard your entrance and your exit from now and unto all time, amen, amen, amen.

A paleographic analysis of the Greek letter forms yields a 5th- or 6th-century AD construction date for the bridge. With the bulk of Roman masonry bridges resting on semi-circular arches, or, to a lesser extent, on segmental arches, the Karamagara Bridge represents an equally rare and early instance of the use of pointed arches not only in late antique bridge building, but also in the history of architecture overall. Along with other late Roman and Sassanian examples, mostly evidenced in early church building in Syria and Mesopotamia, the bridge proves the pre-Islamic origin of the pointed arch in Near Eastern architecture, which the Muslim conquerors subsequently adopted and built on. The stones containing the Greek inscriptions were removed from the bridge and brought to the Elazığ Museum in 1972.

== See also ==
- List of Eastern Roman inventions

== Sources ==
- Galliazzo, Vittorio (1995), I ponti romani, vol. 1, Treviso: Edizioni Canova, pp. 92, 93 (fig. 39), ISBN 88-85066-66-6
- Guillou, André (1993), La Civiltà bizantina, oggetti e messagio, Rome: L'Erma di Bretschneider, pp. 36, 62 (fig. 24), ISBN 978-88-7062-801-2
- Hellenkemper, H. (1977–1999), "Brücke: Byzantinischer Brückenbau", Lexikon des Mittelalters, vol. 2, Stuttgart: Metzler, pp. 730–731
- Hild, Friedrich (1977), "Das byzantinische Strassensystem in Kappadokien", in Hunger, Herbert (ed.), Veröffentlichungen der Kommission für die Tabula Imperii Byzantini, vol. 2, Wien: Verlag der Österreichischen Akademie der Wissenschaften, p. 145, ISBN 3-7001-0168-6
- Mango, Cyril (1976), Byzantine Architecture, New York: H. N. Abrams, p. 129 (plate 138), ISBN 0-8109-1004-7
- O’Connor, Colin (1993), Roman Bridges, Cambridge University Press, p. 129 (E38), ISBN 0-521-39326-4
- Tunç, Gülgün (1978), Tas Köprülerimiz, Ankara, p. 108
- Warren, John (1991), "Creswell's Use of the Theory of Dating by the Acuteness of the Pointed Arches in Early Muslim Architecture", Muqarnas, vol. 8, Brill, pp. 59–65, doi:10.2307/1523154, JSTOR 1523154
- Doomed by the Dam. A Survey of the Monuments threatened by the Creation of the Keban Dam Flood Area, Elazig, 18–29 October 1966, vol. 9, Middle East Technical University, Faculty of Architecture, 1967, pp. 54–57
