= Dibekli, Ağın =

Village in Turkey

Dibekli
- Village
- Location in Turkey
- Coordinates: 38°53′16″N 38°37′8″E
- Country: Turkey
- Province: Elazığ
- District: Ağın
- Population (2021): 33
- Time zone: UTC+3 (TRT)

Dibekli is a village in the Ağın District of Elazığ Province in Turkey. Its population is 33 (2021). The village is populated by Turks.
