= Keban Dam =

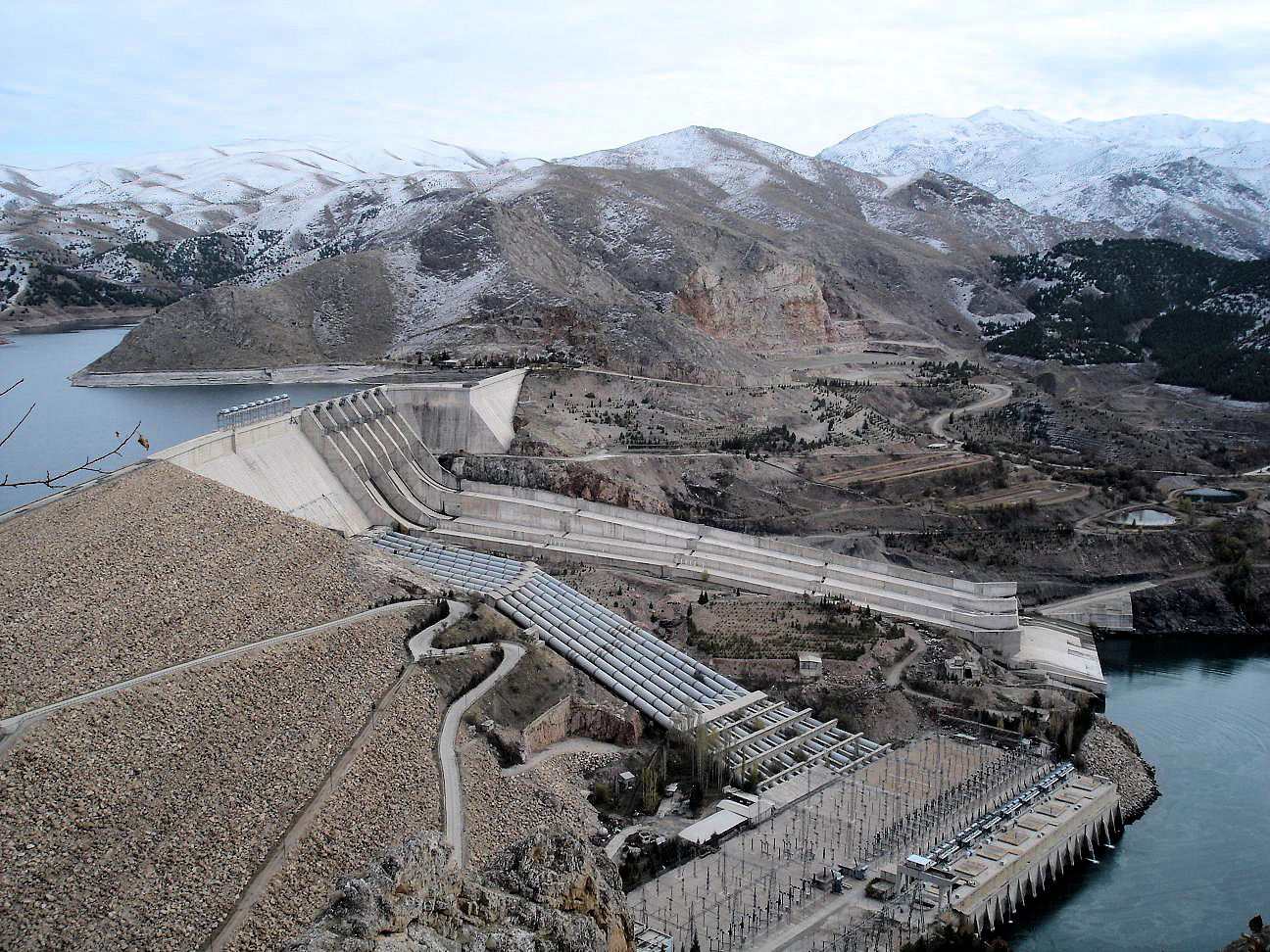

- Location within Turkey
- Location: Elazığ, Turkey
- Coordinates: 38°48′25″N 38°45′25″E
- Construction began: 1966
- Opening date: 1974
- Construction cost: US$300,000,000
- Operator: State Hydraulic Works

Dam and spillways
- Impounds: Euphrates
- Height: 207 m (679 ft)
- Length: 1,097 m (3,599 ft)

Reservoir
- Creates: Keban Reservoir
- Total capacity: 30.6 km^{3} (7.3 mi^{3})
- Catchment area: 64,100 km^{2} (24,749 mi^{2})
- Surface area: 675 km^{2} (261 mi^{2})

Power Station
- Commission date: 1975-1982
- Turbines: 4 × 157.5 MW; 4 × 175.0 MW Francis-type
- Installed capacity: 1,330 MW

The Keban Dam (Turkish: Keban Barajı) is a hydroelectric dam on the Euphrates, located in the Elazığ Province of Turkey. The dam is the first and uppermost of several large-scale dams to be built on the Euphrates by Turkey. Although the Keban Dam was not originally constructed as a part of the Southeastern Anatolia Project (GAP), it is now a fully integrated component of the project, which aims to stimulate economic development in Southeastern Turkey. Construction of the dam commenced in 1966 and was completed in 1974. Keban Dam Lake (Turkish: Keban Baraj Gölü), the reservoir created by Keban Dam, has a surface area of 675 square kilometres (261 sq mi) and is reputedly the fourth-largest lake in Turkey after Lake Van, Lake Tuz, and the reservoir created by the Atatürk Dam.

== Project history ==
Construction of the Keban Dam was first proposed in 1936 by the newly established Electric Affairs Survey Administration, but not started before 1966. Construction was carried out by the French-Italian consortium SCI-Impreglio and completed in 1974. Estimates of the total construction cost vary between US$85 million and US$300 million. At that time, archaeological rescue missions had also been carried out at important sites that were to be flooded. Flooding of the reservoir started in 1974 and led to the displacement of 25,000 people. During the flooding of the Keban Reservoir, Turkey maintained the discharge of the Euphrates at 450 cubic metres (16,000 cu ft) per second, as agreed with the downstream countries of Syria and Iraq. However, as a result of the fact that Syria was at that time filling the reservoir of its newly constructed Tabqa Dam as well, in 1975 a dispute broke out between Syria and Iraq over the amount of water that flowed into Iraq. This dispute, exacerbated by drought which reduced the amount of available water even further, was solved by mediation of Saudi Arabia. After the initial filling of the lake, geological weaknesses in the bedrock on which the dam was built necessitated a temporary lowering of the lake level in order to carry out extensive reinforcement works. Reportedly, Keban Dam was the world's eighteenth-tallest dam at completion, creating Turkey's largest man-made reservoir and third-largest lake until the filling of the reservoir of the Atatürk Dam.

The construction of the dam and its subsequent reservoir resulted in involuntary resettlement of approximately 25,000 people.

=== Archaeological rescue work ===
From 1968 to 1974, the Euphrates and Murat River valleys were the scene of intense archaeological survey and excavation in advance of flooding. The lake formed by the dam is mostly narrow, hemmed in by deep rock valleys. No archaeological sites were found in the survey of these valleys. The Murat valley opens up in two places, and it is here that archaeological (and modern) settlement was concentrated. The Aşvan region, covering about 115 square kilometres (44 sq mi), contained eleven archaeological sites, all relatively small. The largest, Aşvan Kale, covered about 0.9 hectares (2.2 acres) in total; this site, as well as three others were excavated by the British Institute of Archaeology at Ankara: Taşkun Mevkii, Çayboyu and Taşkun Kale. The other broadening of the valley, at the Altınova plain (Elazığ Province), was a well-defined area of thick and fertile alluvial soil. Archaeological survey located 36 sites, of which one, Norşuntepe, covered 8.2 hectares (20 acres), being by far the largest site in the region. It was excavated by a German team led by Harald Hauptmann. The Altınova plain contained other relatively large mounds, including Tepecik (3.4 ha (8.4 acres)), Korucutepe (2.0 ha (4.9 acres)), Değirmentepe (2.0 ha (4.9 acres)) and Körtepe (1.7 ha (4.2 acres)). The late Roman Karamagara Bridge, a notable example of an early pointed arch bridge, has been permanently submerged by the dam.

The area of rescue excavations is well covered in the work by Fahri Dikkaya.

== Characteristics of the dam and the reservoir ==
The Keban Dam is a combined rockfill and concrete gravity hydroelectric dam operated by the State Hydraulic Works (DSİ). The dam is 1,097 metres (3,599 ft) long and its crest is 207 metres (679 ft) above the level of the river-bed (848 metres (2,782 ft) above sea-level). Its eight water turbines are capable of producing 1,330 MW. The storage capacity of Lake Keban is 30.6 cubic kilometres (7.3 cu mi) and the surface area of the lake is 675 square kilometres (261 sq mi), although the lake has reportedly reached higher levels in the past. Due to Lake Keban's relatively high elevation at 845 metres (2,772 ft) above sea-level and its location in an area with high precipitation, evaporation is relatively low at 0.48 cubic kilometres (0.12 cu mi) per year compared to reservoirs in Syria or Iraq. Apart from the Euphrates Valley directly upstream of the dam, the lake has also flooded parts of valleys of the Murat River and the Karasu, the two rivers from which the Euphrates emerges. Although the dam was not originally intended for irrigation, 63,872 hectares (157,830 acres) of agricultural land was irrigated from Lake Keban in 1999.

== See also ==
- Ağın Bridge, aka Ağın (Karamağara) Bridge named in remembrance of the submerged ancient Karamağara Bridge, was Turkey's fourth longest bridge when it was built in 2015.
