= Bahadırlar, Ağın =

Village in Turkey

Bahadırlar
- Village
- Location in Turkey
- Coordinates: 38.9934°N 38.7533°E
- Country: Turkey
- Province: Elazığ
- District: Ağın
- Population (2021): 57
- Time zone: UTC+3 (TRT)

Bahadırlar is a village in the Ağın District of Elazığ Province in Turkey. Its population is 57 (2021).
