= Çayboyu Mound =

Archaeological site in Turkey

- Type: Mound
- Location: Muratçık, Elâzığ, Turkey

Site notes
- Condition: Under Keban Dam Lake

Çayboyu Mound was a mound located 750 meters east of Muratcik Village (formerly Aşvan) in Elazığ Province, Turkey, before the Keban Dam was built. The hill measures 100 x 80 meters and is 3 meters high. However, due to erosion, irrigation channels and the destruction caused by the stream flowing from the east of the hill, it does not give the true size.

== Excavations ==
The mound was discovered during the surveys conducted by R. Whallon and S. Kantman in order to determine the archaeological values that will remain under the Keban Dam Lake. Excavations were carried out in 1970–71 within the framework of the Aşvan Project under the direction of David French from the British Institute of Archeology at Ankara. The excavations went down to the main soil and it is stated that there is a 6-meter-thick filling soil.

== Stratification ==
Two main settlement phases are mentioned in the mound. The top II. Phase I is dated to the 4th millennium BC, and Phase I below is the phase yielding Halaf-like painted pottery finds. The first stage is divided into two sub-stages and the second stage is divided into three sub-stages. Between the two phases is a carbonized grain deposit.

== Findings ==
The pottery findings of the first phase are given in three groups as gray and black wares, pinkish red slipped, buff and brown wares. Stone and chaff are rarely seen in their pastes, and all three ware groups are burnished. Plain wares are in the majority and there are also embossed and paint decorated wares, although they are few.

In the second phase pottery finds, straw tempered pastes are in the majority. Although the ware groups are almost the same, there is an increase in paint decorations. Red and brown bands and crosshatched decorations resemble Halaf and Obaid decorations.

The chipped stone tools recovered are both flint and obsidian, but obsidian was mostly used.

In general, the pottery finds are similar to nearby Fatmalı Kalecik and Kurupınar, Tülintepe, Norşuntepe.
