= Taşkun Kale =

Archaeological site in Turkey

- Type: Mound
- Location: Muratçık, Elâzığ, Turkey

Taşkun Kale is a mound 31 km from Elazığ city center in the northwest direction, and 4 km southeast of Muratcik Village, formerly known as Aşvan. The hill is 150 meters in diameter and 20 meters high. On certain years, it becomes an island due to the rising waters of the Keban Dam Lake. There is an İlhanlı castle on the mound. The settlement appears to have been a small agricultural community.

== Excavations ==
The mound was identified in 1967 during surface surveys conducted by R. Whallon and S. Kantman as part of efforts to document archaeological sites that would be submerged by the Keban Dam Lake. Excavations were carried out from 1970 to 1973 under the direction of David French from the British Institute of Archeology at Ankara, with A. McNicoll leading the work within the scope of the Aşvan Project.

== Stratification ==
The stratigraphy of the mound is similar to the Aşvan Kale Mound. The earliest settlement dates back to the Early Bronze Age II and III. The mound then supposedly was abandoned for a while, and was inhabited again in the Late Hellenistic Period and the Middle Ages.

== Findings ==
A rectangular structure measuring 6.5 x 4.5 meters, with 50 cm thick mudbrick walls, was partially uncovered. Only two rooms of the structure have been revealed. The larger room, with plastered walls, contains a horseshoe-shaped hearth and a platform. The function of the adjacent room remains unclear.

Early Bronze Age pottery findings are scarce. The predominant ceramic type is the Karaz ware, characterized by dark, burnished surfaces. The most commonly found forms are pots with flared necks. Additionally, fragments of painted pottery from the Malatya-Elazığ region were discovered. These feature decorations such as wavy motifs, parallel lines, and filled triangles, painted in reddish-brown over a cream or pink slip.

The only published chipped stone artifact is a winged arrowhead made of flint, a type seen since the Chalcolithic Period.

A distinctive metal artifact from Taşkun Kale Höyük is a set of bronze styluses. These rare items feature a square-sectioned handle and a hexagonal-sectioned blade.

== State of Preservation ==
The Keban Dam Lake, which rises from time to time, turns the mound into a small island, this gradually causes damage to anything still there.

== See also ==
- Aşvan Kale
