= Naoíse Mac Sweeney =

British archaeologist, historian, writer, and academic

Academic background
- Education: University of Cambridge
- Thesis: Community identity and material culture : the case of protohistoric western Anatolia (2007)

Academic work
- Discipline: Ancient History | Classical Archaeology
- Institutions: University of Vienna

Naoíse Mac Sweeney is a British archaeologist, historian, writer, and academic. Since 2020 she has been Professor of Classical Archaeology in the Institute of Classical Archaeology at the University of Vienna.

== Early life and education ==
Mac Sweeney was born in 1982 to Chinese and Irish parents in London. She studied for an undergraduate degree in Classics at the University of Cambridge, followed by a Master's at UCL in Ancient History. She completed a PhD at Cambridge in 2007 with a thesis titled "Community Identity in Protohistoric Western Anatolia".

== Career ==
Following her PhD she spent time in policy research working on conflict and international development. From 2008 she held a Junior Research Fellowship in the Faculty of Classics and Fitzwilliam College at the University of Cambridge. In 2011 she joined the University of Leicester as a Lecturer in Ancient History and Classical Archaeology. In 2020 she was promoted to Professor of Ancient History at Leicester, before being appointed later the same year as a Professor of Classical Archaeology at the University of Vienna.

Her research focusses on aspects of cultural interaction and identity, with a focus on the ancient Greek world and Anatolia from the Iron Age to the Classical period. Her 2018 book Troy: Myth, City, Icon explores the mythic, the archaeological, and cultural significance of Troy. It was short-listed for the 2019 PROSE awards in the category Archaeology & Ancient History. In 2020 Mac Sweeney received an ERC Consolidator Grant for the project Migration and the Making of the Ancient Greek World.

She was awarded a Philip Leverhulme Prize in 2015. In 2017, she held a visiting Research Fellowship at Harvard's Center for Hellenic Studies. Mac Sweeney co-ordinates the international network 'Claiming the Classical', exploring the use of classical antiquity within contemporary political rhetoric. Since 2019 she is the academic editor of Anatolian Studies, the Journal of the British Institute at Ankara, and served as a judge for the Runciman Award. She appeared as a presenter on the BBC TV series Digging for Britain in 2019.

== Selected publications ==
=== Books ===
- 2011. Community Identity and Archaeology: Dynamic Communities at Aphrodisias and Beycesultan. Ann Arbor: University of Michigan Press.
- 2013. Foundation Myths and Politics in Ancient Ionia. Cambridge: Cambridge University Press.
- 2014. (ed.) Foundation Myths in Ancient Societies Dialogues and Discourses. University of Pennsylvania Press.
- 2018. Troy: Myth, City, Icon. London: Bloomsbury.
- 2018. (co-authored with Dr. Jan Haywood) Homer’s Iliad and the Trojan War: Dialogues on Tradition. London: Bloomsbury.
- 2023. The West: A New History of an Old Idea. London: Ebury.

=== Journal articles ===
- 2004. Social complexity and population: a study in the Early Bronze Age Aegean. Papers of the Institute of Archaeology 15: 53–66.
- 2009. Beyond ethnicity: the overlooked diversity of group identities. Journal of Mediterranean Archaeology 22.1: 101–126.
- 2010. Hittites and Arzawans: a view from western Anatolia. Anatolian Studies 60: 7–24.
- 2017. Separating fact from fiction in the Ionian migration. Hesperia 38: 379–421.
