= Michael Gough (archaeologist) =

British archaeologist

Michael Gough

Michael Richard Edward Gough (23 September 1916 – 25 October 1973) was a British archaeologist and the third Director of the British Institute of Archaeology at Ankara (1961-1968). As Director of the BIAA Gough pioneered the archaeology of early Christian sites in Turkey in anticipation of changes in academic viewpoints which were to follow in the 1990s.

Gough attended the Dragon School in Oxford before gaining a scholarship to Stonyhurst College where he concentrated on studying the Classics. In 1936 he gained a Classical Exhibition to Peterhouse, Cambridge where he went on to become a Scholar and Prizeman. In 1939 he gained a First Class Honours Degree in the Classical Tripos with Archaeology as his specialism. With the outbreak of World War II in 1939 Gough joined the Royal Artillery as a Gunner, seeing service in the Middle East and throughout the whole of the Italian Campaign including during the battles of Cassino and on the Sangro. He was discharged from the Army in Germany in the Spring of 1946 with the rank of Major. In 1946 he married Dorothy Mary née Ormsby; together they took part in various excavations.

On being demobilised in September 1946 Gough returned to Stonyhurst College as Classics Master and in 1947 he returned to the University of Cambridge to take a Diploma in Classical Archaeology. He was awarded a Scholarship by the recently founded British Institute of Archaeology at Ankara becoming the institute's second Scholar and later becoming a Fellow. Arriving in Ankara in February 1949 he began to study the classical antiquities at Cilicia. From then until 1951 Gough was almost continually at Ankara as well as Cilicia. He became a fluent speaker of Turkish.

In 1961 Gough succeeded Seton Lloyd to become the third Director of the British Institute of Archaeology at Ankara (BIAA). He had a focus on the Byzantine period, with excavations at the church complex at Alahan Monastery (between 1952 and 1972 Gough directed nine seasons of excavation here) and at Dağ Pazarı. Gough's involvement at Alahan was an important departure from the specialisms of his predecessors in prehistoric archaeology; from this period onwards the British Institute of Archaeology at Ankara began to broaden its academic horizons. Among his scholarly researches were the later history of Anazarbus and the iconoclast decoration at Aloda. During his Directorship the BIAA made one of its most important discoveries at Çatalhöyük. Michael Gough retired as Director of the BIAA in 1968. He was a Member of the Institute for Advanced Study at Princeton, New Jersey from 1968 to 1969.

Following his retirement Gough lived in Kingswear in Devon. He died suddenly in Toronto in Canada in 1973. His final excavation programme at Alahan Monastery in Turkey was completed in 1972 before his death but the report was not published until 1985 by his widow, Mary Gough.

== Publications ==
- Anazarbus, Anatolian Studies 2 (1952) 85–150.
- Mosaics at Sultantepe (Osrhoene) and at Ayaş (Elaeusa Sebaste), Illustrated London News (1953) 670–671.
- A Bath Inscription from Osrhoene, Journal of Hellenic Studies 74 (1954) 179–180.
- A Temple Church at Ayaş, Anatolian Studies 4 (1954) 49–64.
- Historical Appendix, in: Mary Gough, The Plain and the Rough Places. An account of archaeological journeying through the Plain and the Rough Places of the Roman Province of Cilicia in Southern Turkey (London 1954) 227–233.
- Early Churches in Cilicia, Byzantinoslavica 16 (1955) 210–211.
- Early Churches in South-east Turkey, The Listener 53, Nr. 1351 (20 January 1955) 106-.
- Some Recent Finds at Alahan (Koja Kalessi), Anatolian Studies 5 (1955) 115–123.
- Augusta Ciliciae, Anatolian Studies 6 (1956) 165–177.
- A Church of the Iconoclast (?) period in Byzantine Isauria, Anatolian Studies 7 (1957) 153–162.
- A fifth century silver reliquary from Isauria, Byzantinoslavica 19 (1958) 244–250.
- Report on archaeological work carried out at Alahan in 1957, Türk Arkeoloji Dergisi 8 (1958) Nr. 2, 6–7.
- Rez.: G. Faider-Feytmans, Recueil des bronzes de Bavai (1957). Antiquity 32 (1958) 288–289.
- The "Paradise of Dağ Pazarı": A Newly Discovered Early Christian Mosaic in Southern Asia Minor, Illustrated London News 233, 1958, 644–646.
- Karlık and Dağ Pazarı, 1958, Türk Arkeoloji Dergisi 9 (1959) Nr. 2, 5–6.
- Report on Work carried out during Summer, 1958, Anatolian Studies 9, 1959, 7–8.
- Rez.: F. G. van der Meer, C. Mohrmann, Atlas of the Early Christian world (1958), Antiquity 33 (1959) 222–223.
- Rez.: M. Guido, Syracuse. A Handbook to its History and Principal Monuments (1958). Antiquity 33, 1959, 143.
- Dağ Pazarı 1959, Türk Arkeoloji Dergisi 10 (1960) Nr. 2, 23–24.
- Isauria and Cilicia, 1959, Anatolian Studies 10 (1960) 6–8.
- The Early Christians (London 1961) – Übersetzungen: I primi cristiani (Milano 1962); Den fornkristna kulturen: fem sekel historia, tro och konst (Stockholm 1963); De eerste Christenen. (Zeist 1963); Os primitivos cristãos (Lisboa 1969).
- The Church of the Evangelists at Alahan. A preliminary report, Anatolian Studies 12 (1962) 173–184.
- Alahan Monastery, Anatolian Studies 12 (1962) 6–8.
- [Beiträge zu:] Monuments from Lycaonia, the Pisido-Phrygian Borderland, Aphrodisias. Edited by Sir William Calder and J. M. R. Cormack. With contributions from M. H. Ballance and M. R. E. Gough. Monumenta Asia Minoris Antiqua 8 (1962).
- Excavations at Alahan Monastery. Second preliminary report, Anatolian Studies 13 (1963) 105–115.
- Excavations at Alahan 1962, Anatolian Studies 13 (1963) 5–7.
- Excavations at Alahan Monastery. Third preliminary report, Anatolian Studies 14 (1964) 185–190.
- The monastery of Eski Gümüş. A preliminary report, Anatolian Studies 14 (1964) 147–161.
- Excavations at Alahan 1963, Anatolian Studies 14 (1964) 6–8.
- Eski Gümüş 1963, Anatolian Studies 14 (1964) 8–9.
- British archaeology abroad, Antiquity 38 (1964) 12–13.
- [From Rome to Byzantium], in: Michael Grant, The Birth of Western Civilization: Greece and Rome (London 1964).
- Christian archaeology in Turkey, in: Atti del VI Congresso internazionale di archeologia cristiana. Ravenna 23–30 settembre 1962 (Roma 1965) 405–412.
- The monastery church of Eski Gümüş, Archaeology 18 (1965) 254–263.
- The monastery of Eski Gümüş. Second preliminary report, Anatolian Studies 15 (1965) 157–164.
- Eski Gümüş, 1964, Anatolian Studies 15 (1965) 8–9.
- A thurible from Dağ Pazarı, Anadolu araştirmaları 2 (1965) 231–235.
- British archaeology abroad, Antiquity 39 (1965) 39–40.
- Rez.: J. u. N. Thierry, Nouvelles Églises Rupestres de Cappadoce, American Journal of Archaeology 69 (1965) 87–88.
- Restoration at Gümüş, Anatolian Studies 16 (1966) 9.
- Alahan, Anatolian Studies 16 (1966) 9–10.
- British archaeology abroad, Antiquity 40 (1966) 93–94.
- Alahan Monastery. Fourth preliminary report, Anatolian Studies 17 (1967) 37–47.
- Excavations at Alahan 1967, Türk Arkeoloji Dergisi 16 (1967) Nr. 1, 95–99.
- British archaeology abroad, Antiquity 41 (1967) 130–131.
- Alahan Monastery. A Masterpiece of Early Christian Architecture, Bulletin of the Metropolitan Museum of Art 26 (1967–68) 455–464.
- Alahan Monastery 1968, Türk Arkeoloji Dergisi 17 (1968) Nr. 1, 67–70.
- Alahan Monastery. Fifth preliminary report, Anatolian Studies 18 (1968) 159–167.
- Alahan Monastery, Anatolian Studies 18 (1968) 7–8.
- Alahan Monastery, 1969, Anatolian Studies 19 (1969) 4.
- [advisory editor] The Hamlyn History of the World in Colour. Vol. 4: Byzantium and the Ancient East (Feltham 1969) [darin Introduction].
- Alahan Monastery, 1970, Türk Arkeoloji Dergisi 19 (1970) Nr. 1, 95–98.
- Excavations at Alahan Monastery 1970, Royal Ontario Museum Archaeological Newsletter NS 64 (Sept. 1970).
- Alahan, 1970, Anatolian Studies 21 (1971) 12–13.
- The Secular Appointment of Alahan Monastir, American Journal of Archaeology 75 (1971) 202–203.
- [Revision des Kapitels Cilicia], in: A. H. M. Jones, The cities of the eastern Roman provinces. 2. ed. (Oxford 1971) 181–214.
- The Emperor Zeno and some Cilician Churches, Anatolian Studies 22 (1972) 199–212.
- Excavation of Alahan Monastery, 1972, Royal Ontario Museum Archaeological Newsletter NS 91 (Dec. 1972)
- The Origins of Christian Art, 'The World of Art Library' series (London 1973).
- Alahan Monastery: The Final Season, Royal Ontario Museum Archaeological Newsletter NS 101 (Oct. 1973).
- The Peaceful Kingdom. An Early Christian mosaic pavement in Cilicia Campestris, in: Mansel'e armağan. Mélanges Mansel (Ankara 1974) 411–419.
- Three Forgotten Martyrs of Anazarbus in Cilicia, in: Essays in Honour of Anton Charles Pegis (Toronto 1974) 262–267.
- Rez.: Th. Mathews, The early churches of Constantinople. Architecture and liturgy (1971). Art Bulletin 56 (1974) 120–121.
- Notes on a visit to Mahras Monastery in Isauria, Byzantine Studies/Études byzantins 1 (1974) 65–72.
- Rez.: S. Kostof, Caves of God. The Monastic Environment of Byzantine Cappadocia (1972). Byzantine Studies/Études byzantins 1 (1974) 95–96.
- Dağ Pazarı. The basilical church extra muros, in: Studies in memory of David Talbot Rice (Edinburgh 1975) 147–163.
- s. v. Adana, Augusta, Claudiopolis, Dağ Pazarı. Epiphaneta, Epiphaneia. Flaviopolis. Hierapolis Castabala, Kanlidivane, Mallos, Mopsuestia, Soloi (Pompeiopolis), Tarsus, Zephyrion (Mersin). In: Richard Stillwell et al. (ed.): The Princeton Encyclopedia of Classical Sites. Princeton University Press, Princeton, N.J. 1976, ISBN 0-691-03542-3.
- Gough, Mary (ed.), Alahan. An early Christian monastery in southern Turkey. Based on the Work of Michael Gough (Toronto 1985) (Pontifical Institute of Mediaeval Studies. Studies and texts, 73).
- Alahan Monastery and its Setting in the Isaurian Country Side, in: ibid 3–17.
