= Stephen Mitchell =

Steven Mitchell, Steve Mitchell or Stephen Mitchell may refer to:

== Public officials ==
- Stephen Mitchell (British politician) (1884–1951), Scottish Unionist MP for Lanark
- Stephen A. Mitchell (politician) (1903–1974), American attorney and Democratic party official
- Stephen Mitchell (judge) (born 1941), British president of National Security Appeals Panel, Information Tribunal
- Steve Mitchell (Texas politician), American mayor and city councilman in Richardson, Texas

== Sportsmen ==
- Steve Mitchell (basketball, born 1951), American forward who played in Holland and Italy
- Steve Mitchell (basketball, born 1964), American point guard for Washington Bullets
- Steve Mitchell (sailor) (born 1970), British competitor in 2004 Summer Olympics
- Steven Mitchell (American football) (born 1994), wide receiver for Houston Texans and Los Angeles Rams

== Writers ==
- Stephen Mitchell (philanthropist) (1789–1874), Scottish tobacco manufacturer and library founder
- Stephen Mitchell (translator) (born 1943), American poet, anthologist and scholar
- Stephen A. Mitchell (psychologist) (1946–2000), American co-author of Object Relations in Psychoanalytic Theory
- Stephen Mitchell (historian) (1948–2024), British epigrapher of Anatolia
- Stephen Mitchell (journalist) (born 1949), British newspaperman and BBC media executive
- Steve Mitchell, American DC comics inker for 1984–85 Sun Devils

== Characters ==
- Stevie Mitchell, father of Billy Mitchell on BBC soap opera EastEnders from 2022 to 2024
