= Elizabeth French =

British archaeologist (1931–2021)

Elizabeth French FSA
- Born: Elizabeth Bayard Wace; 19 January 1931; London, England
- Died: 10 June 2021 (aged 90)
- Known for: Excavations at Mycenae; study of Mycenaean terracotta figurines
- Spouse: David French (m. 1959; div. 1975)
- Parent: Alan Wace (father)

Academic background
- Education: Newnham College, Cambridge; University College London
- Thesis: The Development of Mycenaean Terracotta Figurines (1961)
- Doctoral advisor: Martin Robertson

Academic work
- Discipline: Archaeology
- Sub-discipline: Mycenaean Greek archaeology
- Institutions: Royal Masonic School for Girls, Rickmansworth; University of Manchester; British School at Athens; University of Cambridge

Elizabeth Bayard French FSA (née Wace; 19 January 1931 – 10 June 2021), also known as Lisa French, was a British archaeologist and academic, specialising in Mycenaean Greece, especially pottery and terracotta figurines and the site of Mycenae. She was the first woman to serve as director of the British School at Athens (BSA).

Wace spent much of her early life in Greece, where her father, Alan Wace, was director of the BSA. She attended her first archaeological excavations at the age of eight, at Mycenae. During the Second World War, she was evacuated from Greece to the United States, and subsequently lived briefly in Egypt before finishing her education at Cheltenham Ladies' College and Newnham College, Cambridge. After leaving Cambridge, she studied archaeological conservation at University College London and worked as a secondary school teacher while completing a part-time doctorate at London, which she was awarded in 1961.

Wace married the archaeologist David French in 1959. She excavated over many years at Mycenae and at other sites in Greece and Turkey, where she lived with her husband at the British Institute at Ankara. After her divorce in 1975, she returned to the UK, where she worked at the University of Manchester from 1976 until 1989. As director of the BSA between 1989 and 1994, she completed further fieldwork and excavation at Mycenae and published accounts of the finds from the site. She returned to Cambridge from 1994, where she lectured on Mycenaean pottery, and died in 2021.

== Early life and education ==
Elizabeth Bayard Wace was born in 1931 in London, the daughter of the archaeologists Alan Wace and Helen Wace (née Pence), and god-daughter of Wace's colleague Carl Blegen; the family moved to Cambridge when she was 3 years old. She first joined her father's excavations at Mycenae in 1939, aged 8. Following this excavation, the family stayed in Athens, where Wace attended a British Council school; after the outbreak of World War II, Wace and her mother left for America in June 1940, before joining her father in Alexandria, Egypt, in 1944 on his appointment as Professor of Classics and Archaeology at the Farouk I University at Alexandria. In 1946, the family returned to the UK, where Wace completed her schooling at Cheltenham Ladies' College.

Wace read Classics at Newnham College, Cambridge, from 1949 to 1952, where she held the Mathilde Blind Scholarship; during the summers she joined Wace's excavations at Mycenae. After graduating, French studied for a Diploma in Conservation at the Institute of Archaeology in London, and then taught Classics at the Royal Masonic School for Girls, Rickmansworth, joining the excavations at Mycenae during the summers as she had during her undergraduate studies; while teaching, she began working on a part-time PhD at University College London, under the supervision of the classicist and poet Martin Robertson, on The development of Mycenaean terracotta figures. During this time she also attended the British School at Athens as a student (1958–59) and, thanks to a Virginia Gildersleeve Fellowship from the International Federation of University Women, spent the next year (1959–60) in Greece studying Mycenaean material for her thesis as well as finds from Ayios Stephanos and Tiryns, and excavating at Mycenae and Knossos. Her PhD was awarded in 1961.

== Career ==
French was a leading expert in Mycenaean pottery, especially figurines, and a long-standing excavator of the site of Mycenae. In her PhD thesis, she developed a detailed classification scheme for a series of Mycenaean terracotta figurines dating from the Late Helladic period (c. 1500–1100 BC). She coined the term kourotrophos for a particular class of these artifacts depicting a woman holding a child. She excavated at Mycenae for many years, from 1950-1957 with her father Alan Wace, and following his death with Lord William Taylour and George Mylonas until 1969, and developed a systematic classification of Mycenaean pottery, enabling its use in establishing the relative date of archaeological finds. French and Taylour were also joint editors, with Kenneth Wardle, of the series of publications arising from the Mycenae excavations, Well-Built Mycenae (1981-). In the 1960s she lived in Ankara with her husband David French, at that time Director of the British Institute at Ankara, joining excavations at Ayios Stephanos (Greece) and Can Hasan (Turkey), and working on material excavated from Greek sites such as Tiryns. French served as the Warden of Ashburne Hall, a residential hall of the University of Manchester, from 1976 to 1989, during which time she was also an honorary lecturer in the Manchester Department of Archaeology; in 1989, she succeeded Hector Catling as Director of the British School at Athens, becoming the first woman to hold the post. She served as director until 1994. After returning from Athens, she settled in Cambridge, lecturing on Mycenaean pottery for the university's Faculty of Classics.

French's key publications include an account of the monuments and history of the whole site of Mycenae, and completed and published a survey of the remains around Mycenae in collaboration with Spiros Iakovidis and the Archaeological Society of Athens, Her joint publication with P. S. Stockhammer, "Correlating recent research: the pottery of Mycenae and Tiryns in the second half of the 13th century BC", is the first attempt to align discoveries at these two important Mycenaean sites. She appeared in the final episode of Michael Wood's documentary series In Search of the Trojan War discussing the dating of potsherds found at Troy and received special thanks in the episode's credits.

French was elected a fellow of the Society of Antiquaries in 1979, and received an honorary doctorate from the University of Athens in 2004. In 2013, she gave the Mycenae Archive of papers from the British excavations at this site between 1920 and 1969, as well as her own archive of professional papers, to the Faculty of Classics, University of Cambridge.

== Personal life ==
French was married to the archaeologist David French (1933–2017) from 1959 to 1975; the couple, who met while studying material from Mycenae in 1956, had two daughters. She died in Cambridge on 10 June 2021, aged 90.

== Selected publications ==
- French, Elizabeth (1971). "The Development of Mycenaean Terracotta Figurines". The Annual of the British School at Athens. 66: 101–187. doi:10.1017/S0068245400019146. JSTOR 30103231. S2CID 194064357.
- Mycenae: Agamemnon's Capital. The Site and Its Setting. (Tempus, 2002)
- Archaeological Atlas of Mycenae, with Spiros Iakovidis (Archaeological Society of Athens, 2003)

== Resources ==
- Archive of Elizabeth French's professional papers (University of Cambridge Faculty of Classics Archives)
- Mycenae excavation and publication archive (University of Cambridge Faculty of Classics Archives)
