= CSEC =

CSEC may refer to:

- Calgary Sports and Entertainment Corporation, owner and operator of several Calgary-based sports teams
- Caribbean Secondary Education Certificate
- Communications Security Establishment Canada, later known as the Communications Security Establishment, the Canadian government's national cryptologic agency
- Commercial sexual exploitation of children
- Commission on State Emergency Communications, an agency of the State of Texas; see Steve Mitchell
- Citadel Security Services, in the computer game Mass Effect
