= Aşvan Kale =

Archaeological site in Turkey

Aşvan Castle
- Aşvan Kale
- Type: Mound
- Periods: Early Bronze Age to Middle Age
- Location: Muratçık, Elâzığ

History
- Condition: Under the Keban Dam Lake.
- Discovered: 1945
- Excavation dates: 1968-72

Asvan Kale is an archaeological mound located to the west of the Muratçık, Elâzığ village (formerly known as Aşvan), about 35 km from Elazığ city in Turkey. It was flooded after the construction of Keban Dam Lake. It was formerly on the south bank of the Murat River, which is a tributary of the Euphrates.

The hill, which has a flat top and steep slopes, measured 130 x 110 meters at the base.

== Excavations ==
The mound was discovered by İsmail Kılıç Kökten in 1945. It was later studied by R. Whallon and S. Kantman in 1967. Excavations were carried out in 1968-72 under the direction of David French, under the direction of Stephen Mitchell, within the scope of the Aşvan Kale Project carried out by the British Institute of Archeology at Ankara within the framework of the Keban Dam and Hydroelectric Power Plant Project studies. In the same project, Taşkun Kale and Çayboyu mounds were also examined.

== Stratification ==
According to the results obtained in the excavations, the settlement started in the Early Bronze Age phases II and III, and continued into the Iron Age, Roman Period and Middle Age layers. The Early Bronze Age settlement is almost three-quarters thick of the total cultural deposit of the settlement.

== Findings ==
It is understood from the remains of the walls and the debris from the walls that mudbrick was used in its early architecture.

Pottery studies show that, in the lower layers, red paint decorated sherds and Karaz red-black burnished ware are seen in all its varieties. Karaz ware yielded in all levels is handmade, grit and chaff tempered. The vessels are mostly black, rarely brown and red on the outside, and reddish brown or beige on the inside. In addition, the existence of another local cream colored ware is mentioned.

Karaz buff burnished ware, and paint decorated ware with parallels in the Malatya - Elazığ region, were found in the next building levels.

Hellenistic, Roman and Medieval type of architecture were found in the upper levels.

== Economy ==
Cultivated crops, weeds and useful wild plant species were also found in the excavation area, and the seeds and plant parts found were analyzed and catalogued in detail.

There is also evidence of climate change in the region.

== See also ==
- Taşkun Kale
