= Stephen Mitchell (historian) =

Stephen Mitchell (26 May 1948 – 30 January 2024) was a British historian and epigrapher, specialising in Hellenistic, Roman, and Byzantine Anatolia. He was a professor at Swansea and Exeter University.

== Background ==
Stephen Mitchell was the son of David Mitchell, a tutor of philosophy at Worcester College, Oxford, and Barbara Mitchell, a tutor of Latin at St Anne's College, Oxford. He studied literae humaniores at St John's College, Oxford from 1966 to 1970 and then undertook a DPhil on The History and Archaeology of Galatia under the supervision of Ewen Bowie and Eric Gray, which he completed in 1975.

Mitchell and his partner Matina had three children: Lawrence, Daniel, and Samuel. He died on 30 January 2024, at the age of 75.

=== Career ===
Mitchell was a temporary lecturer of Latin and ancient history at the University of Bristol from 1973 to 1974 and had a research lectureship at Christ Church, Oxford from 1975 to 1976. He was lecturer in ancient history at the University of Swansea from 1976 until 1993, when he was promoted to full professor. From 2002 until 2012, he was Levehulme Professor of Hellenistic Culture at Exeter University, where he established a "Centre for Hellenistic Culture and Society," and served as head of department.

Mitchell became a member of the British Institute at Ankara in 1970, serving as a member of its council, as honorary secretary (1996–1999, 2009–2014), as chair (2016–2021), and as vice-president (2023–2024). His advocacy of the institute was "instrumental in its transformation into a substantial research powerhouse that connects the ancient and the contemporary." He was also President of the British Epigraphy Society (1999–2002) and of the Association Internationale d'Épigraphie Grecque et Latine (AIEGL, 2008–2012).

=== Research ===
Mitchell's research focussed on Hellenistic, Roman, and Byzantine Anatolia. His doctoral thesis on Galatia was innovative for its combination of literary, archaeological, and epigraphic sources. In the 1980s, he established the "Pisidia Survey Project", which carried out archaeological survey work in Pisidia and Pamphylia, in collaboration with Marc Waelkens, Sabri Aydal, and Lutgarde Vandeput. He authored or co-authored monographs on Cremna, Pisidian Antioch, and the Via Sebaste.

In addition, to this regionally focussed work, Mitchell produced more wide-ranging works of religious and cultural history, beginning with Anatolia: land, Men, and Gods in Asia Minor (1993). In the 2000s, Mitchell directed an AHRC project on "Pagan Monotheism in the Roman Empire", arguing for the existence of monotheism in the Greco-Roman world outside of the Abrahamic religions.

In the 2010s, Mitchell and David French co-authored a corpus of The Greek and Latin Inscriptions of Ankara (Ancyra) (2012, 2019).

=== Recognition ===
Mitchell was elected as a Fellow of the British Academy in 2002 and subsequently served on its council. He received an honorary doctorate in theology from the Humboldt University of Berlin in 2006 and became an honorary fellow of St. John's College, Oxford in 2018. In 2020, Mitchell received the Gustave Schlumberger Prize from the French Académie des Inscriptions et Belles-Lettres for services to epigraphy and his volumes on the inscriptions of Ankara.

== Select bibliography ==
- Mitchell, Stephen (1995). Cremna in Pisidia: an ancient city in peace and in war. London, Swansea: Duckworth The classical press of Wales. ISBN 0715626965.
- Mitchell, Stephen; Waelkens, Marc (1998). Pisidian Antioch: the site and its monuments. London: Duckworth The classical press of Wales. ISBN 0715628607.
- Mitchell, Stephen (1993). Anatolia: land, men, and Gods in Asia Minor. Oxford, New York: Clarendon Press. ISBN 9780198140801.
- Mitchell, S.; French, D. (2012). The Greek and Latin Inscriptions of Ankara (Ancyra) Vol. 1: From Augustus to the end of the third century AD. Munich: Beck.
- Mitchell, S.; French, D. H. (2019). The Greek and Latin Inscriptions of Ankara (Ancyra) Vol. 2: Late Roman, Byzantine and Other Texts. Munich: Beck.
- Mitchell, Stephen; Van Nuffelen, Peter (2010). One god: pagan monotheism in the Roman Empire. Cambridge; New York: Cambridge University Press. ISBN 9780521194167.
- Mitchell, Stephen (2015). A history of the later Roman empire, AD 284-641 (Second ed.). Malden, MA: Wiley Blackwell. ISBN 9781118312421.
- Mitchell, Stephen; Wagner, Robert; Williams, Brian Glyn (2021). Roman archaeology in a South Anatolian landscape: the Via Sebaste, the Mansio in the Döşeme Boğazi, and regional transhumance in Pamphylia and Pisidia with a catalogue of Late Roman and Ottoman Cisterns. Istanbul: Koç University Press. ISBN 9786057685728.
- Mitchell, Stephen (2023). The Christians of Phrygia from Rome to the Turkish conquest. Leiden; Boston: Brill. ISBN 978-90-04-54637-0.

== Sources ==
- Isayev, Elena (2024). "Stephen Mitchell (1948–2024)" (PDF). CUCD Bulletin. 53: 1–14.
