= Tille =

Tille may refer to:

- Tillé, village in northern France
- Tille (river), river in eastern France
- Tille Höyük, archaeological site in Turkey
- Tille trevally, a fish
