= Lutgarde Vandeput =

Director of British Institute at Ankara

Lutgarde Vandeput MBE

Academic background
- Education: Katholieke Universiteit Leuven
- Thesis: The Architectural Decoration at Sagalassos. Local Development within the Framework of Anatolian Architecture. The Imperial Period.

Academic work
- Discipline: Archaeology
- Institutions: British Institute at Ankara

Lutgarde Vandeput MBE is the director of the British Institute at Ankara.

== Education and early career ==
Vandeput studied classical archaeology at the Katholieke Universiteit Leuven with a Masters thesis on "Splijttechnieken in de Oudheid: een kritische statusquaestionis van het onderzoek in het oostelijke deel van de Middellandse Zee." She completed her doctorate in 1994 with a thesis on "The Architectural Decoration at Sagalassos. Local Development within the Framework of Anatolian Architecture. The Imperial Period."

== Work ==
While working on her doctoral thesis, Vandeput became a research assistant with the Belgian National Research Foundation, working on the Sagalassos Archaeological Research Project based at Katholieke Universiteit Leuven, and continued post doctoral work on the project until 2001 when she became an assistant professor at the Archaeological Institute of the University of Cologne.

Between 1997-8 Vandeput was an Alexander von Humboldt Fellow at the University of Cologne. In 2006, Vandeput became the director of the British Institute at Ankara. As part of her work there she oversees the Safeguarding Archaeological Assets of Turkey (SARAT) project. She directed the Pisidia Survey Project 1998-2012, and also worked with the Aspendos Archaeological Project 2008-2016. Based on her work in Pisidia, Vandeput has also worked on the BIAA project "Living Amid the Ruins: Archaeological Sites as Hubs of Sustainable Development for Local Communities in Southwest Turkey."

Vandeput sits on the editorial board of the journal Anatolian Studies.

== Honours ==
Vandeput was awarded an MBE for services to UK/Turkey cultural relations in 2019.

== Selected publications ==
- The British Institute at Ankara: 60 years young Anatolian Studies 58 (2008), pp. 1–14.
- (with Veli Köse) Pisidia Survey Project: Melli 2000 Anatolian Studies 52 (2002), pp. 145–152.
- The Architectural Decoration in Roman Asia Minor: Sagalassos: a case study (Leuven, 1997)
