= Tille Höyük =

Archaeological site in Turkey

Coordinates: 37°44′N 38°53′E

- Geldibuldu
- Interactive map of Tille Höyük
- Location: Adıyaman Province, Southeastern Anatolia, Turkey

Site notes
- Archaeologists: David French

Tille Höyük is an archaeological site in Geldibuldu village in the Adıyaman Province of Turkey. It is a small settlement mound on the west bank of the Euphrates some 60 km east of Adıyaman.

The site was excavated by the British Institute of Archaeology at Ankara, under the direction of David French, from 1978 to its flooding by the Atatürk Reservoir in 1990. Surface pottery suggests the site was first occupied in the fourth millennium BC, but large-scale excavation was restricted to the Medieval, Classical and Iron Age levels of the site. A small step-trench recovered Iron Age and Bronze Age pottery in 1980; a more substantial trench was cut into the side of the mound in the last season and reached Late Bronze Age levels.

The Iron Age levels at Tille have been identified on the basis of the presence of iron objects, and the parallels in pottery with Late Assyrian pottery from Mesopotamia. More precise evidence for dating the extensive Iron Age burnt level comes from comparison of its architectural features. The pebble mosaic courtyard and surrounding building plan is found close parallels in eighth century BC. Neo-Assyrian buildings at Til Barsip and Arslan Tash in Syria. The date of the extensive burnt level can be placed in the eighth-seventh centuries BC. on archaeological grounds.

Finds from the site are in the Adıyaman Museum.

== See also ==
=== British Institute at Ankara publications ===
- "Tille Höyük 1, The Medieval Period" by John Moore
- "Tille Höyük 3.1, The Iron Age: Introduction, Stratification & Architecture" by Stuart R. Blaylock
- "Tille Höyük 3.2, The Iron Age: Pottery, Objects and Conclusions" by Stuart R. Blaylock
- "Tille Höyük 4, the Late Bronze Age and the Iron Age Transition" by G.D. Summers
