= Can Hasan 1 =

Archaeological site in Turkey

- Interactive map of Can Hasan 1
- 37°15′47″N 33°19′53″E
- Type: Mound
- Location: Alaçatı, Karaman, Turkey

Site notes
- Condition: Urbanized

Can Hasan 1 Mound is an archaeological site located near the village of Alaçatı, formerly known as Can Hasan, approximately 12–15 km northeast of the city center of Karaman province, Turkey. It is situated about 750 meters southeast of Can Hasan 3 Mound. Among the trio of mounds known by the same name in the vicinity of Can Hasan Village, Can Hasan 1 is attributed to the Chalcolithic Age, Can Hasan 2 to the Hellenistic, Roman, and Byzantine periods, and Can Hasan 3 to the Neolithic Age settlement.

Can Hasan 1 Mound is a hill measuring 360 x 280 meters in dimensions and reaching a height of 5 meters. (Note: In some sources, it is indicated to have a diameter of 400 meters.) The plain where these three mounds are located is fertile and not far from the northern slopes of the Taurus Mountains.

== Excavations ==
Can Hasan 1 is mentioned in the publications of Kılıç Kökten as one of the mounds located to the northeast of Karaman. Subsequently, in the years 1951-52 and 1958, James Mellaart, A. Hall, and David French conducted examinations of the site during surface surveys of the Konya Plain. Excavation efforts were undertaken by the British Institute at Ankara, led by David French once again, between 1961 and 1967.

== Stratigraphy ==
During the excavations, seven layers have been identified in the mound. These layers, from the most recent (upper) to the oldest (lower), are as follows:

- Layer 1 - Late Chalcolithic Age (comprising six architectural phases),
- Layer 2
  - Phase 2A - Middle Chalcolithic Age,
  - Phase 2B - Transition from Early to Middle Chalcolithic Age
- Layer 3 - Early Chalcolithic Age,
- Layers 4 to 7 - Late Neolithic Age

== Findings ==
Brick and mudbrick were the primary construction materials used, supplemented with wooden supports. Walls and floors were plastered with mud. It is noted that the entrances to the dwellings were located on the ceiling.

The architecture of the Late Chalcolithic Age exhibits differences from the Early Chalcolithic architecture in terms of orientation, layout, wall thickness, and brick dimensions. Structures within this period display a degree of continuity, with renovations or wall additions observed in almost all of them. The buildings are scattered and irregular, featuring courtyards and open spaces in between. These courtyards and open areas contain hearths, enclosed small spaces, and compartments. Walls are typically coated with white clay.

The architecture of the Middle Chalcolithic period has been excavated within a limited area. In Layer 2A, which represents this period, the architecture exhibits the most significant differences from the architecture of Layer 2B, namely the use of stone foundations in 2A and smaller brick dimensions compared to 2B. The architecture of Layer 2B presents a more organized architectural plan compared to the Late Chalcolithic layer. Mudbrick-walled structures that directly rest on the ground were constructed in a contiguous arrangement without leaving gaps in between.

Unlike the Late Chalcolithic structures, there is no evidence of a second floor in the Middle Chalcolithic buildings; however, in this layer, structures are two-storied, with the walls of the second floor being thinner. It is evident that this layer has experienced a fire.

The predominant pottery group of the Late Chalcolithic layer consists of red, red-brown, and black-slipped ceramics. In Layer 2A, plain artifacts in light brown and ochre colors are the most frequently found group.

In Layer 2A, fragments of clay tripod figurines depicting humans, animal figurines, a small figurine body, discs, sling stones, and spoons have been recovered. In Layer 2B, within a structure that had suffered from fire, numerous small clay female figurines were found. Some of them are flat and relatively schematic, yet facial features are clearly delineated.

In the Chalcolithic Age layers, both flint and obsidian knapped stone tools have been found. Those recovered in Layer 2B display a less refined craftsmanship. In Layer 2A, carved containers made from various stones, stone beads, axes, marble bracelets, grinders, and grinding stones have been discovered as rubbing stones.

In the Late Chalcolithic Age layer, bone remains of domesticated animals such as sheep, goats, cattle, pigs, and horses, as well as deer, turtles, cats, and rodent bones, have been discovered. Examination of a cow skull has indicated the domestication of this species.

== Evaluation and dating ==
Based on the results of radiocarbon dating conducted on certain findings, the Early Chalcolithic Age is estimated to span from 5500 to 5000 BCE, the Middle Chalcolithic Age from 5000 to 4250 BCE. While such results are not available for the Late Chalcolithic Age, the excavation director suggests the dates of 3750 to 3250 BCE.
