= Geldibuldu, Kahta =

Village in Adıyaman Province, Turkey

Geldibuldu
- Village
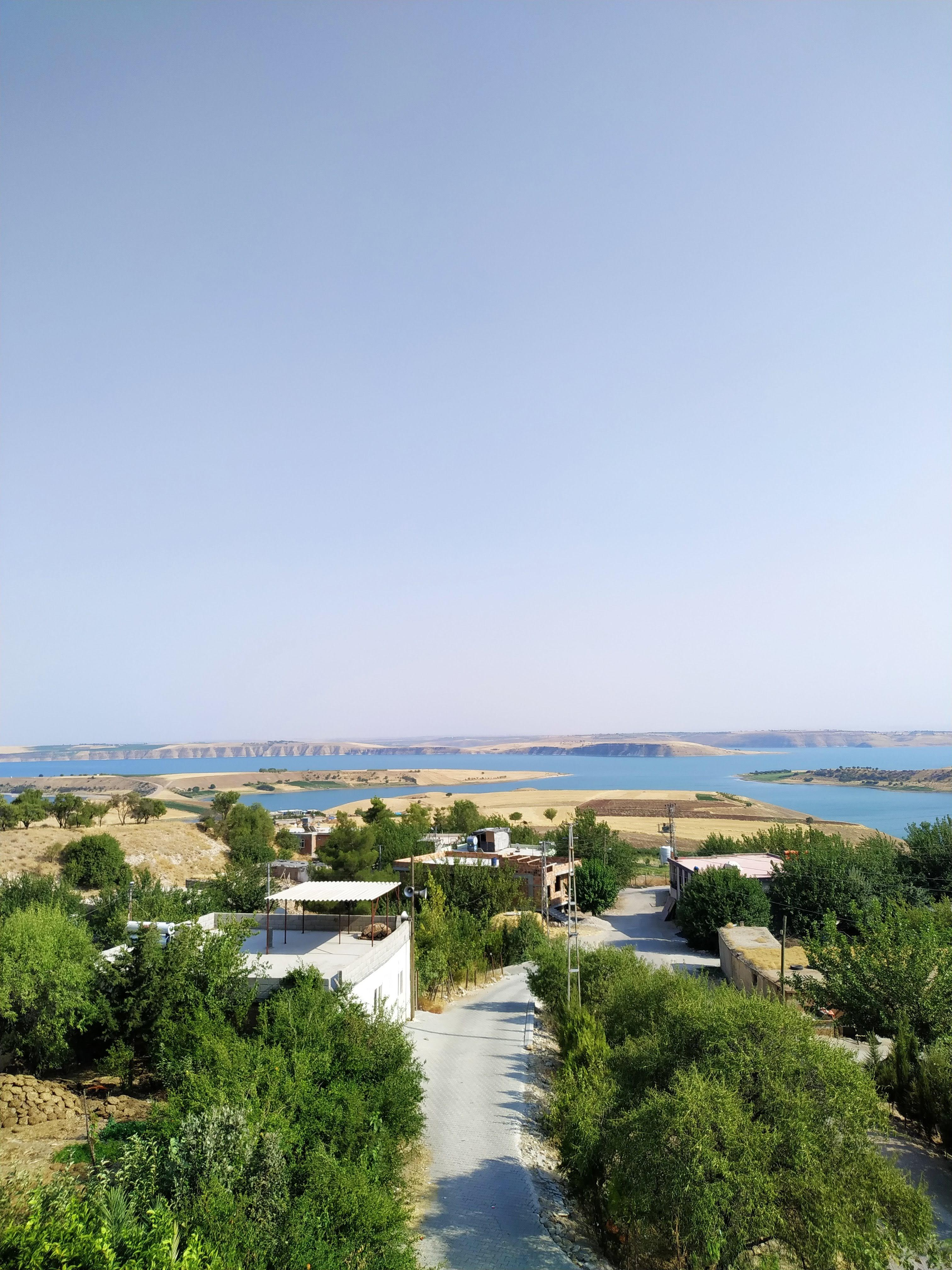

- Location within Turkey
- Coordinates: 37°43′41″N 38°52′09″E
- Country: Turkey
- Province: Adıyaman
- District: Kâhta
- Population (2021): 685
- Time zone: UTC+3 (TRT)

Geldibuldu (Kurdish: Qertîlbe) is a village in the Kâhta District, Adıyaman Province, Turkey. It is populated by Kurds of the Gewozî tribe and had a population of 686 in 2021.

The village is an ancient site dating back to the Hellenistic and Roman era including tombs, cemeteries and a bath house.

== Geography ==
Geldibuldu lies on the right bank of the Euphrates and around 30 km east of Kahta town and 60 km east of Adıyaman. It is surrounded by gardens and have several fountains in its vicinity.

== See also ==
- Tille Höyük
