= Muratçık, Elazığ =

Village in Turkey

Muratçık
- Village
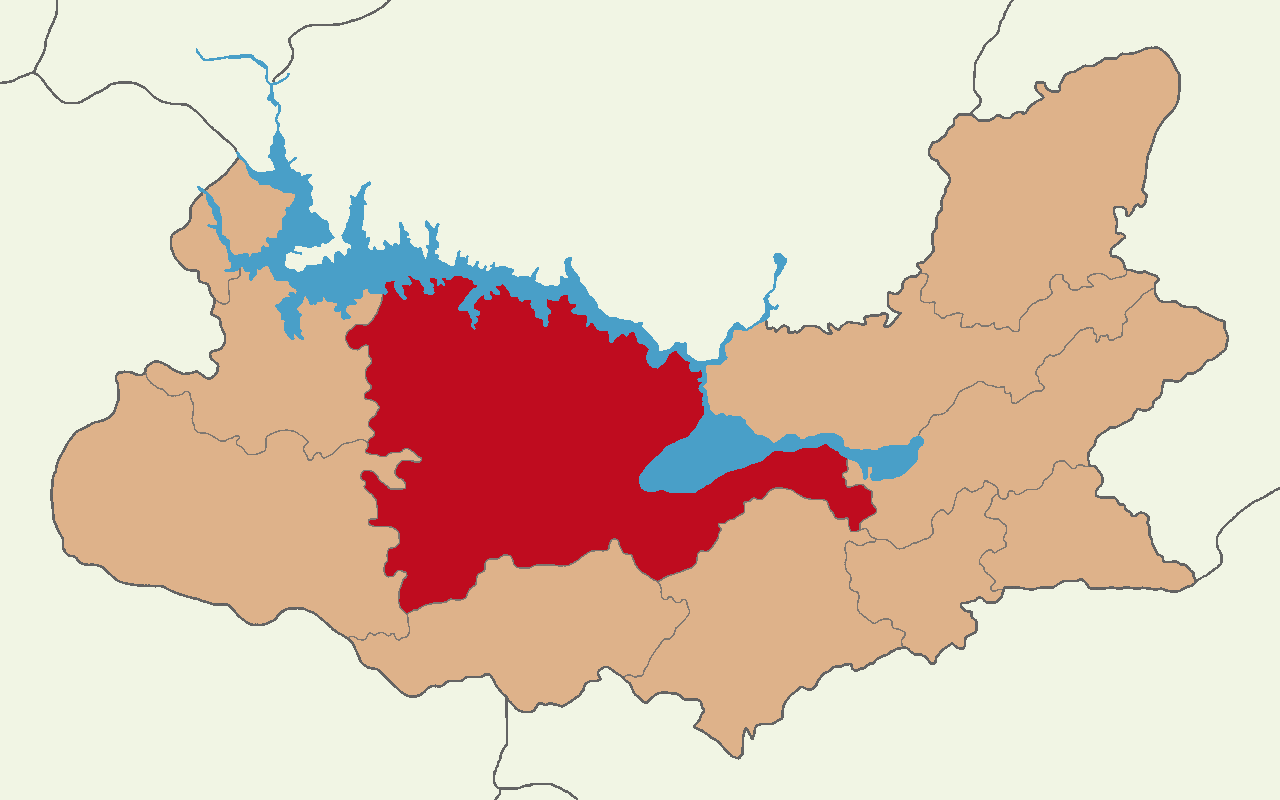

- Location within Turkey
- Coordinates: 38°50′45″N 38°57′40″E
- Country: Turkey
- Province: Elazığ
- District: Elazığ
- Population (2021): 354
- Time zone: UTC+3 (TRT)

Muratçık is a village in the Elazığ District of Elazığ Province in Turkey. Its population is 354 (2021).

It was formerly known as Aşvan. In its vicinity was the archaeological mound of Asvan Kale that was later covered by the Keban Dam lake.
