= Steve Mitchell (Texas politician) =

Place 6 Council member Richardson, Texas
- In office May, 2005 – June, 2021
- Preceded by: Carol Wilson
- Succeeded by: Arefin Shamsul

Personal details
- Education: University of North Texas
- Website: Re-Elect Steve Mitchell

Steve Mitchell is the City Councilman for Place 6 in Richardson, Texas. Mitchell has served as the representative for Place 6 since May 2005. In addition, Mitchell served as Mayor of Richardson from May 2007 to May 2009, when he replaced long-serving Mayor Gary Slagel, who in turn replaced Mitchell as Mayor in May 2009.

Prior to 2012, mayors in Richardson were elected from the council, and the office was not a separate place. Therefore, council member and one-time mayor Mitchell was always the representative from Place 6, before, during, and after his term as mayor.

== Early life ==
Steve Mitchell's parents moved the family to Richardson, Texas, in 1965 when Steve was three years old. Steve attended elementary schools in the Richardson Independent School District until the sixth grade. With the addition of a third child, the Mitchell family relocated to McKinney, Texas in 1973 where they purchased a turn-of-the century Victorian home several blocks from the town square.

After graduating from McKinney High School in 1980, Steve enrolled at the University of North Texas (then known as North Texas State University) where he received both his bachelor's and master's of science degrees in accounting with an emphasis in Tax in 1985.

From 1982 through 1986, Steve's father Travis served on the McKinney City Council.

== Civic activities ==
Prior to serving on Richardson's City Council, Mitchell participated in a number of civic activities:

- Richardson Rotary Club, where Mitchell served as Vocational Service Director, Camp RYLA Chairman, and RISD-Rotary D-FY-IT Chairman.
- Sign Control Board (City of Richardson) where Mitchell served for over 10 years, with his last year as chairman.
- City Plan Commission (City of Richardson)
- Leadership Richardson Class IX
- Citizens Police Academy Class II (City of Richardson)
- Citizen Fire Academy Class X (City of Richardson)
- Greenwood Hills Neighborhood Association (Vice President)
- Dallas County Republican Precinct Chairman for Precinct 1700 (former)
- Dallas Regional Mobility Coalition (named by City of Richardson)

== Political career ==
=== Richardson City Council ===
in 2005, Mitchell ran for the open seat in Place 6 of the Richardson City Council, incumbent Carol Wilson having chosen not to run again. In a three-way race, Mitchell received just over 50% of the vote, avoiding a runoff:

Candidate	Votes	Percentage
Steve Mitchell	2,326	50.60%
Craig Cotton	785	17.08%
Bernard "Bernie" Mayoff	1,486	32.33%

In 2007, Mitchell was reelected to the Place 6 seat by a much larger majority:

Candidate	Votes	Percentage
Steve Mitchell	4,007	72.55%
Matthew Moseley	1,516	27.45%

In addition to being the representative from Place 6 on the City Council, Mitchell served as Mayor from 2007 to 2009.

In 2009, Mitchell was unopposed for Place 6:

Candidate	Votes	Percentage
Steve Mitchell	5,974	100.00%

In 2011, Mitchell was again unopposed for Place 6:

Candidate	Votes	Percentage
Steve Mitchell	6,326	100.00%

Mitchell is the Council liaison to

- Dallas Regional Mobility Coalition (DRMC)

=== Mayor of Richardson ===
Mitchell served as Mayor of the City of Richardson from 2007 to 2009.

While Mitchell was mayor, Richardson received its first bond ratings from Standard & Poor's and Moody's as AAA from both agencies. While the ratings were the result of years of work, Mayor Mitchell was proud to have this designation occur during his term as mayor as a result of his continuation of the council's pro-business policies.

== Gubernatorial appointments ==
Mitchell has been appointed by Texas Governor Rick Perry to two state-level posts.

The Commission on State Emergency Communications (CSEC) is an agency of the State of Texas charged with oversight of the Statewide 9-1-1 and Poison Control Programs.

Appointed by the governor of Texas, the Board of Regents is the governing body of the University of North Texas System, which consists of the University of North Texas (in Denton), the UNT Health Science Center at Fort Worth, and the UNT Dallas Campus.
