= Alahan Monastery =

Ancient monastic complex in Mercin, Turkey

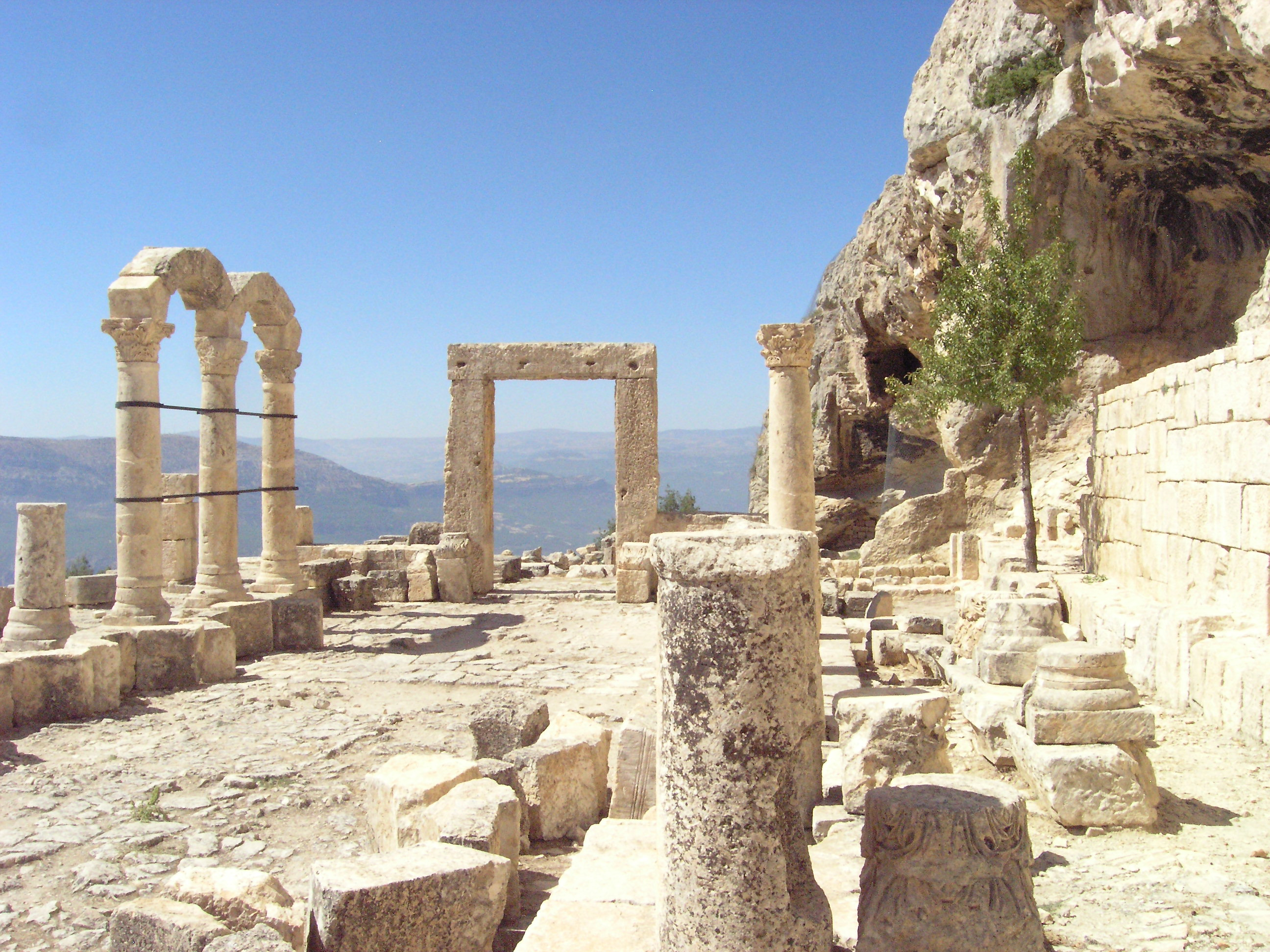
- The West Church at Alahan

- Location within Turkey
- 36°47′29″N 33°21′13″E
- Type: Monastery or pilgrimage shrine
- Location: Mersin Province, Turkey
- Region: Isauria

Site notes
- Condition: In ruins

Alahan Monastery (Turkish: Koja Kalessi) is a complex of fifth-century buildings located in the mountains of Isauria in southern Asia Minor (Mersin province in modern day Turkey). Located at an altitude of 4,000 ft, it stands 3,000 ft over the Calycadnus valley and is a one-hour walking distance from the village of Geçimli. Although termed a monastery in many sources, this attribution is contested and more recent scholarship consider it to be a pilgrimage shrine. The complex played a significant role in the development of early Byzantine architecture, and practically everything known about it can be attributed to the excavations of Michael Gough.

== History ==
Construction took place during two periods. The first occurred in the mid-fifth century under Emperor Leo I, while the second occurred in the last quarter of the fifth century under Emperor Zeno. The complex contains two churches, rock-cut chambers, a baptistery, living quarters, and many other spaces, like a forecourt, necropolis, bathhouse, and lower terrace. There is debate about the monastery's original purpose, but it nonetheless became a communal living space for monks and those seeking pilgrimage until the seventh century AD, at which point it became abandoned. Upon assuming power, Emperor Zeno, an Isaurian, took over construction and likely funded the project. He often returned to his homeland as a means of retreat, which could suggest his interest in completing the project.

The complex is an example of expert Isaurian stonemasonry. Alahan is a key site in the history of early Byzantine architecture, half a century before the great achievements of Anicia Juliana and Justinian in Constantinople.

== Buildings ==
=== Cave Church ===
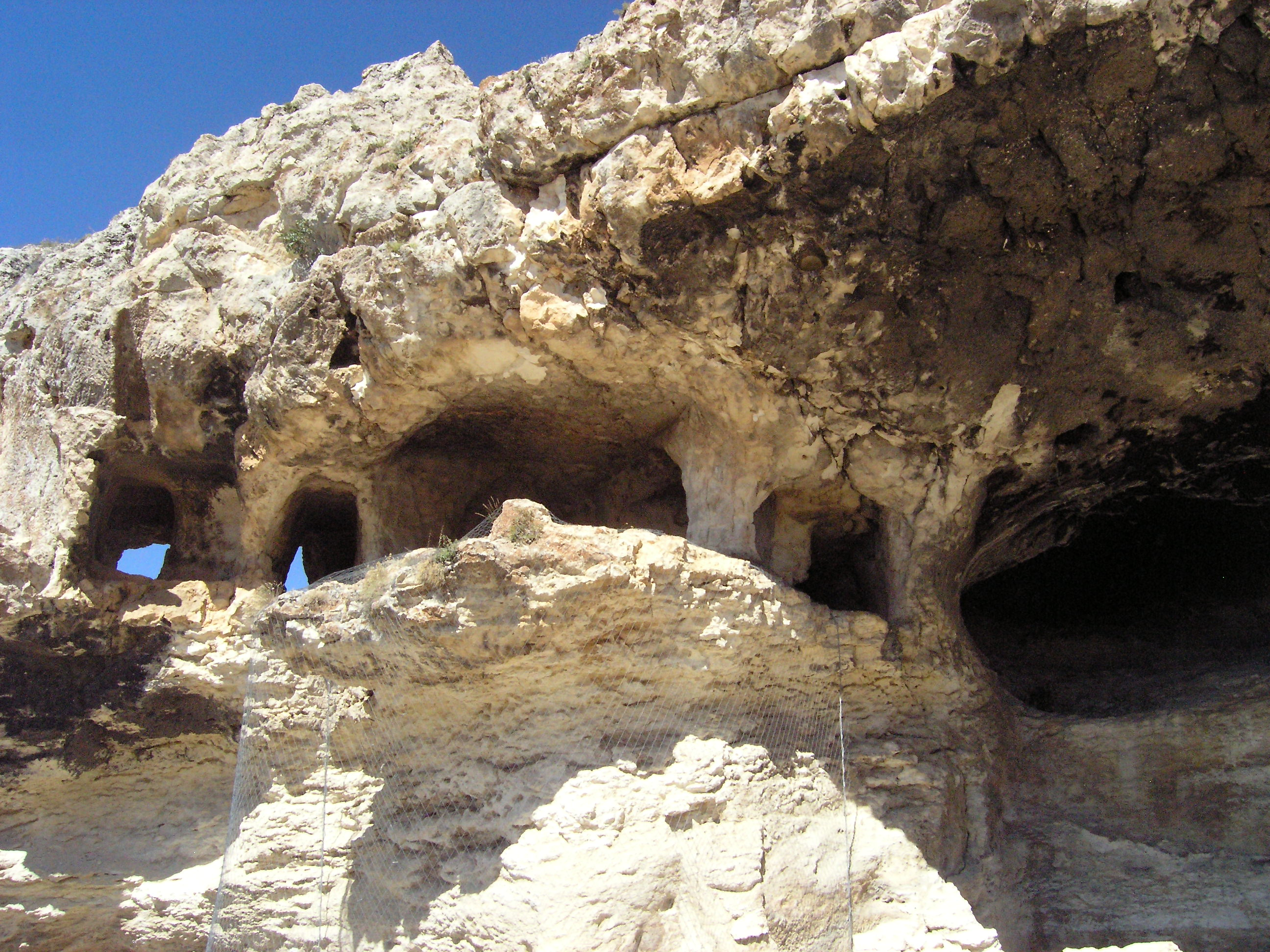
Cave Complex

At the western end of the site there is a large naturally formed cave about 10 m (32.8 ft) high. It used to contain many large rooms arranged on three floors, each just over 2 m high, though now it is almost completely empty. Inside the cave complex there is a church, which is about 7.5 by 7.7 m (24.5 by 25 ft) in size. The cave church is believed to be the first of the monastery's churches to be built.

=== West Church ===
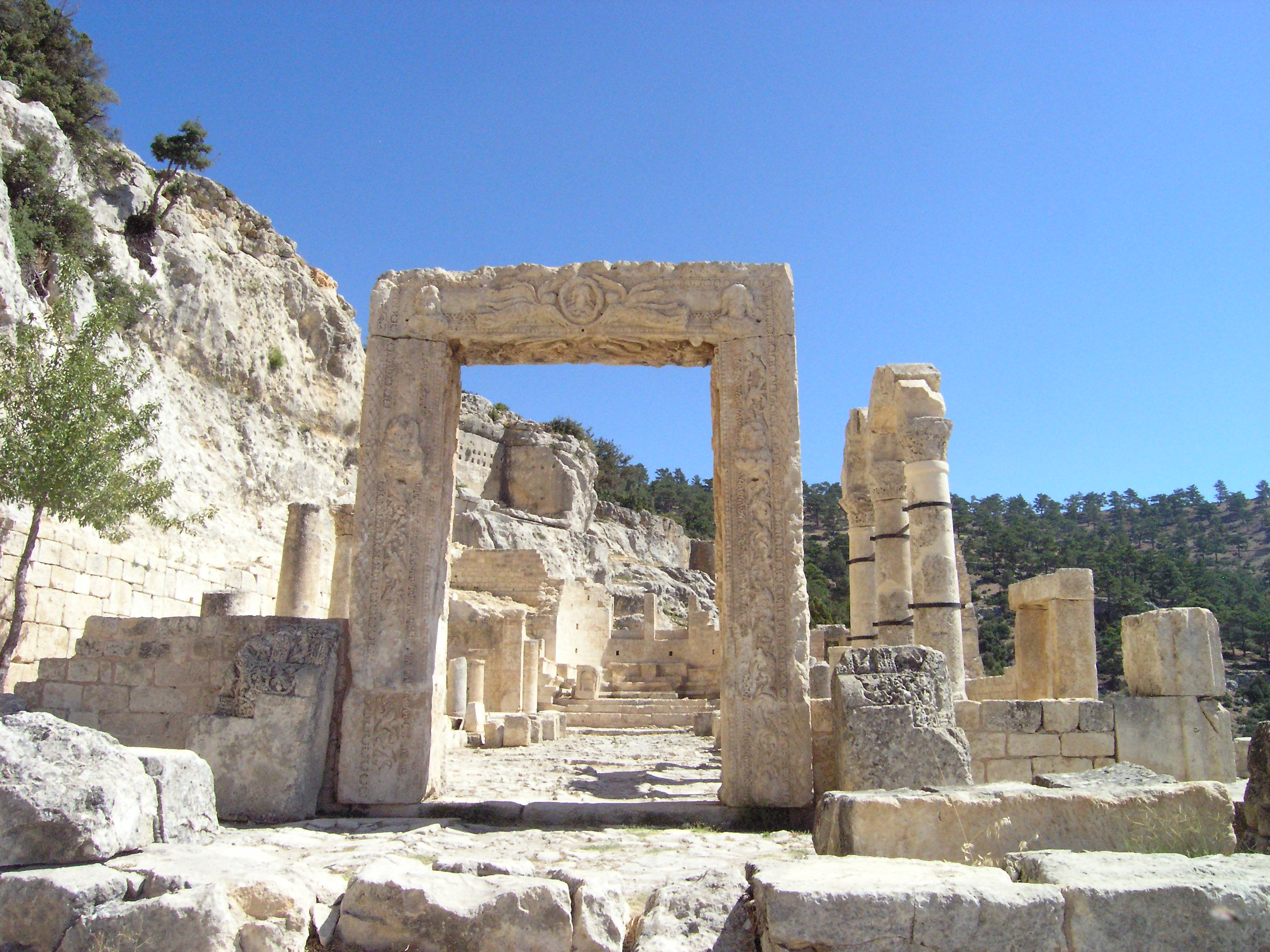
Doorway of the West Church

The West Church, referred to by Gough as the "Church of the Evangelists", is the largest of all the churches in the monastery, with an overall measurement of 36 by 16 m (118 by 52.5 ft). The church has a basilica form with three rows - a central nave and two side aisles. It was built after the cave church, but before the East Church. It is the least preserved of all three churches and early visitors to the site did not identify it as a church, but as a gateway to the site. According to Gough, the provision of two pastophories proves that it was a church, and decorations found on its adorned gateway make reference to Evangelism, supporting Gough's given name for the building.

Gough's excavation discovered decorations of sculpted masonry and rich mosaics, which suggests that the church had wealthy patronage during its time.

The rugged terrain of the mountains meant that much of the cliff side had to be cut back during building. Even then, the plan of the church was adapted to fit the lay of the land. As a result, it doesn't resemble the perfect east/west orientation that was typical of churches at the time.

=== East Church ===
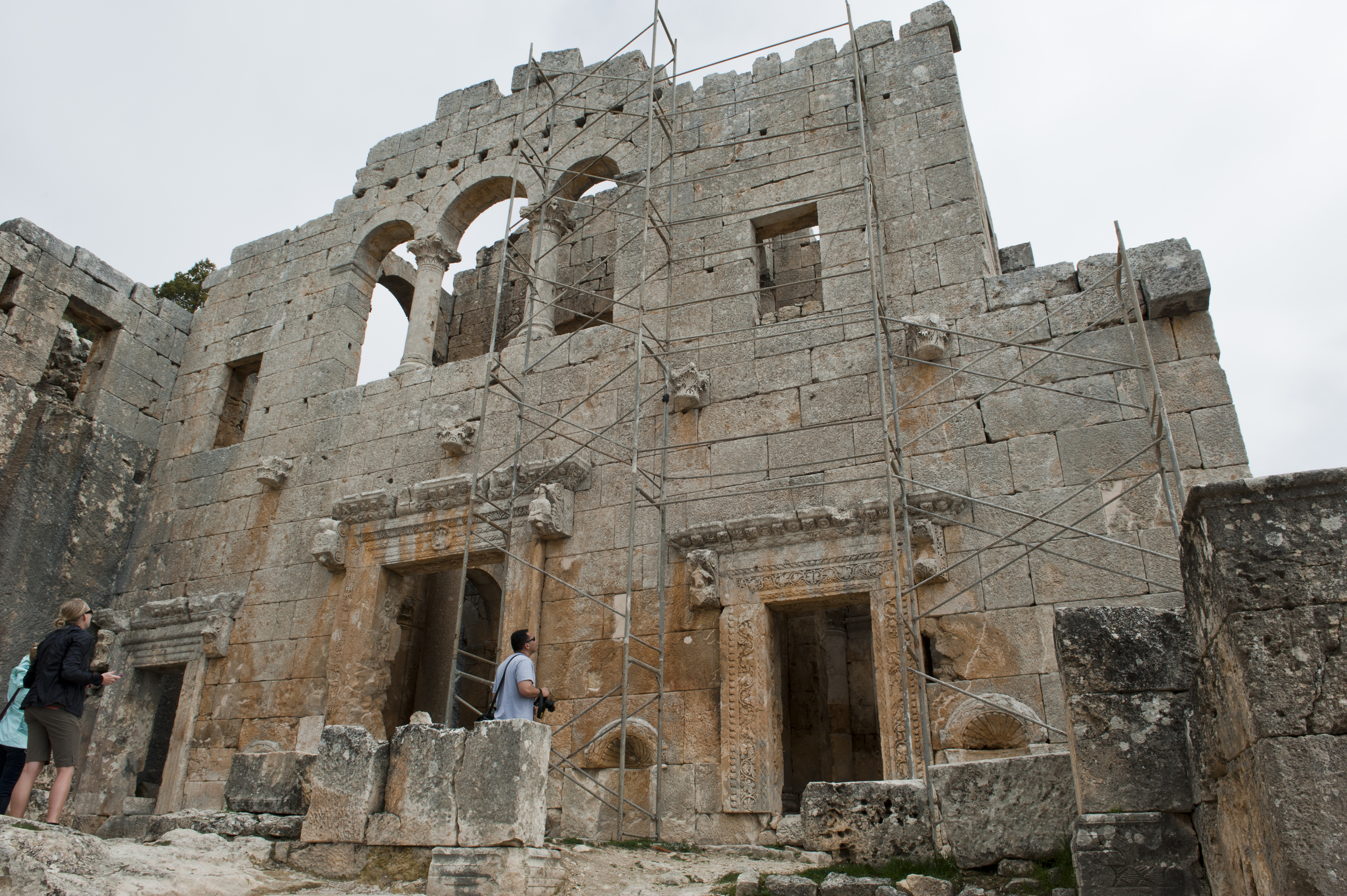
West façade of the East Church

The East Church, located on the far eastern side of the monastery, is the best preserved of all the churches. It is considerably smaller than the West Church, measuring 23 by 15 m (75.5 by 49 ft) in size. It has a basilica design with a tower superimposed over the east section of the nave. Gough believes that the roof was likely not made of stone, as practically none were found among the rubble of his excavation. Rather, he suggests that it was likely made of a light timber tiles.

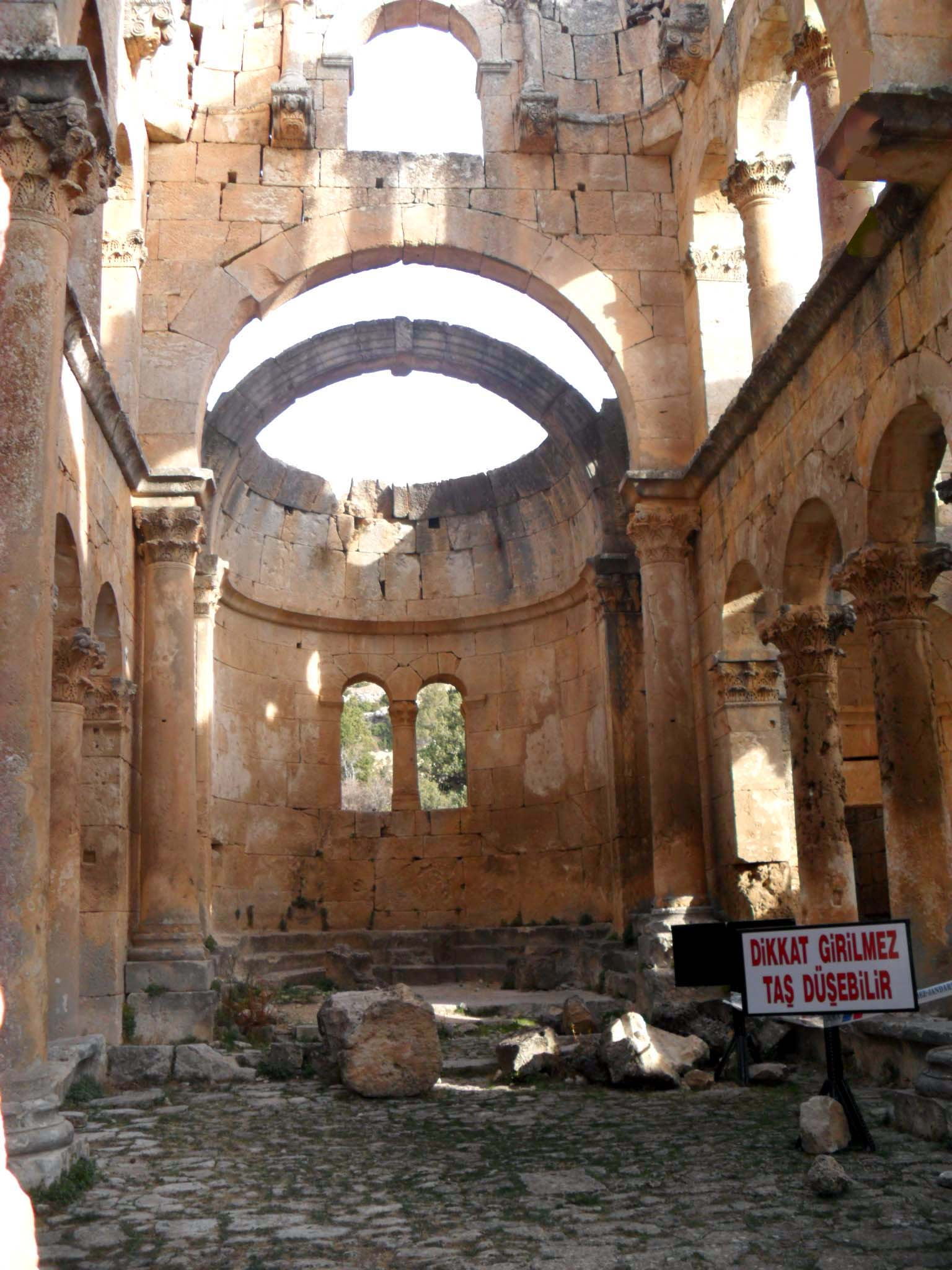
Inside the East Church

This church is less decorated than the other two because it was only approached from within the monastery complex. It contains only slight adornments on the entrance.

=== Colonnaded Walkway ===
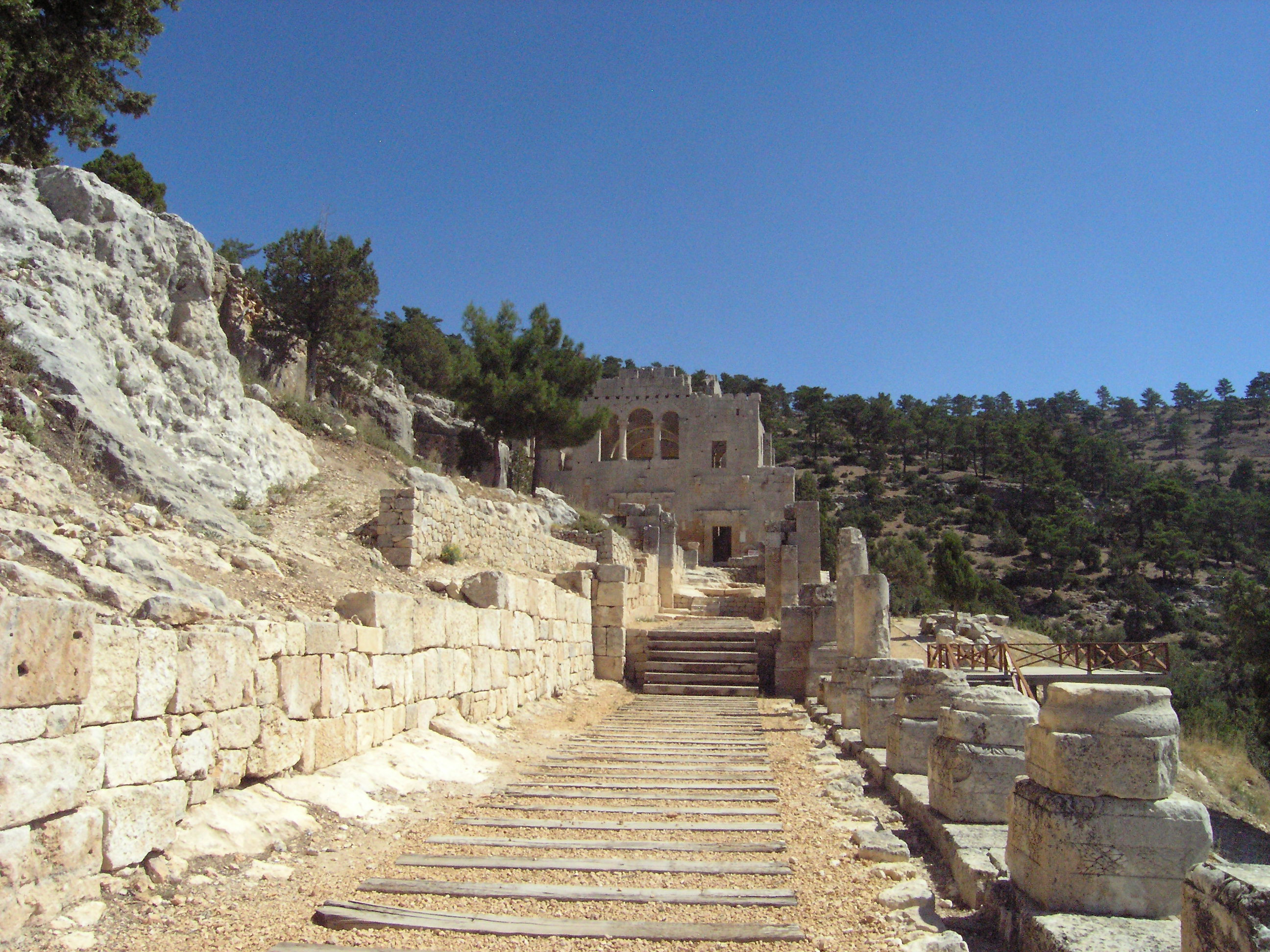
Colonnaded Walkway

A colonnaded walkway, originally covered, connects the West and the East Churches. The walkway also provided access to other buildings in the complex, like the baptistery and living quarters. It also restricted access to the site from the hillside below, thanks to a high retaining wall on its south side. No evidence exists to suggest the type of roof that covered the walkway.

=== Baptistery ===
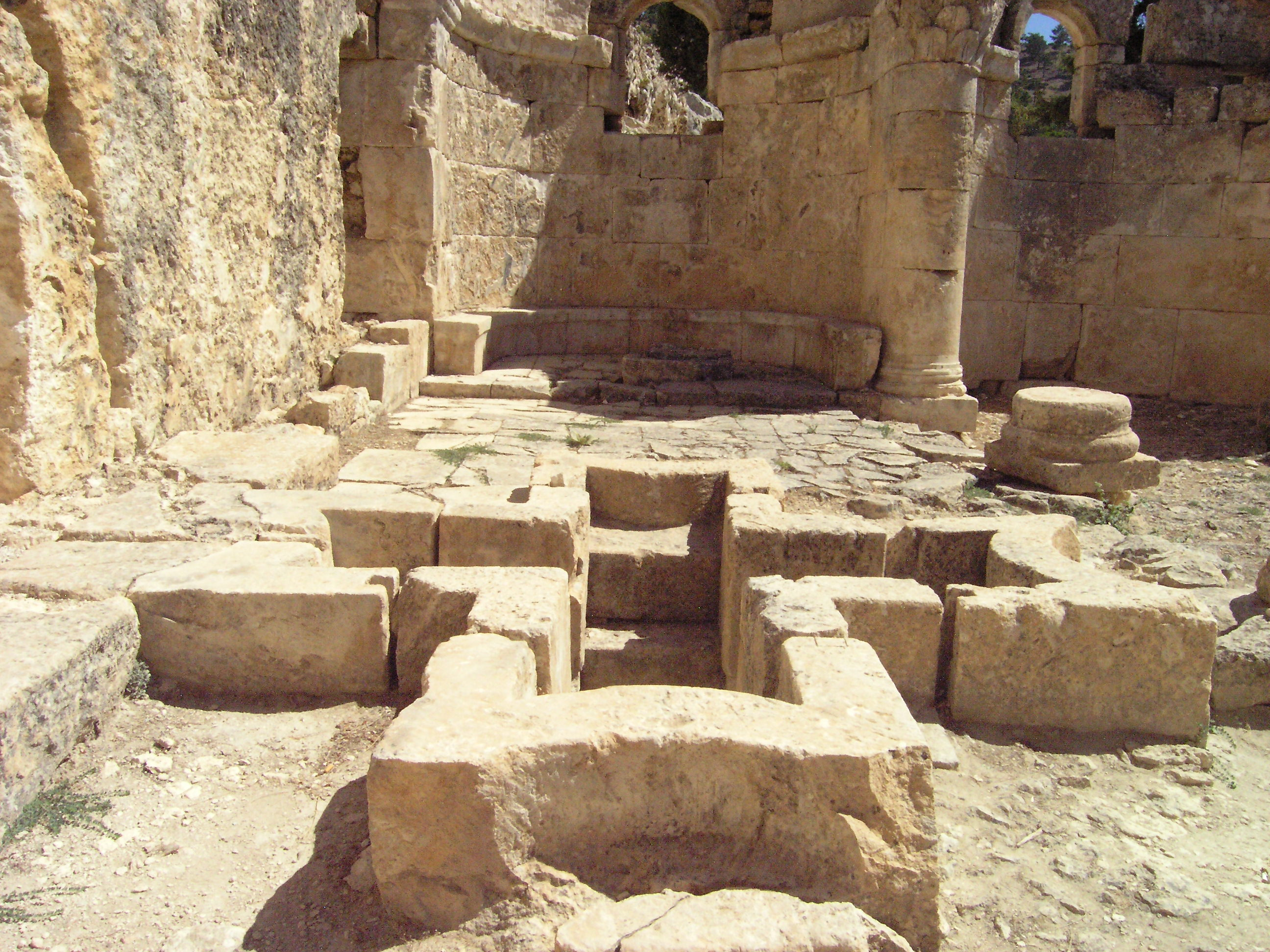
Baptistery and its baptismal pool

A twin-apsed baptistery with two aisles, oriented east-west, with an entrance to the south through the north wall of the colonnaded walkway. The discovery of a cruciform-shaped baptismal pool confirms that the building was used as a baptistery. It is believed that it was built as the community at Alahan expanded, as a font located in the cave church likely served as the original baptistery. There is painting present inside the baptistery that is not in the east church, perhaps because the painters were no longer present when the east church was finished. This suggests that there was a considerable lapse in time between the construction of each building. There is not enough evidence to suggest conclusively what type of roof covered the building.

=== Living Quarters ===
As the community grew, the living quarters in the cave complex were no longer sufficiently sized. Additional living quarters were built between the west church and the baptistery with four separate groups of rooms. These quarters could be entered through the cave complex and the colonnaded walkway.

=== Other spaces ===
The complex has many other spaces. These include a forecourt, located outside the east church and north of the colonnaded walkway; a necropolis just west of the forecourt; tombs of Tarasis the Elder and Younger, carved into the cliff side next to the necropolis; a spring complex that directed water around and under buildings, both to keep them dry and to provide a reliable water source to the community; a bath house, located far east, past the east church; and a lower terrace in the valley that was used for agriculture.

== Visitors ==
The Ottoman traveler, Evliya Çelebi, visited the monastery in 1671–72 and his account recorded his amazement along with his recommendation that, "This is something that deserves a visit." The first European visitor Count Leon de Laborde who arrived in 1826 was enthusiastic but inaccurate in his written accounts of the monastery. This was followed by the English cleric, A.C. Headlam, who wrote an exhaustive article which gives meticulous detail to the monastic complex as well as the church located at the east end. Headlam postulated that Alahan may be a known as the Byzantine monastery Apadna, which was restored during Justinians reign, however, Michael Gough states Alahan shows no signs of restoration to support this premise.

== World Heritage Status ==
This site was added to the UNESCO World Heritage Tentative List on February 25, 2000 in the Cultural category.
