= David H. French (archaeologist) =

British archaeologist

- Born: David Henry French; 30 May 1933; Bridlington
- Died: 19 March 2017 (aged 83)
- Known for: Roman roads of Asia Minor
- Spouses: Elizabeth Wace (m. 1959; div. 1975); Pamela Pratt (m. 1977)

Academic background
- Education: St. Catharine's College, Cambridge

Academic work
- Discipline: Archaeologist
- Institutions: British Institute at Ankara

David Henry French (30 May 1933 – 19 March 2017) was a British archaeologist known for his work in Asia Minor.

== Early life and education ==
French was born on 30 May 1933 in Bridlington, East Riding of Yorkshire, England. Having received a free place as a direct grant pupil, he was educated at Pocklington School, a private school in Pocklington. He studied classics at St Catharine's College, Cambridge.

== Career ==
French was the fourth director of the British Institute at Ankara (1968-1994). After he was appointed to this position, he continued his previous work on Can Hasan 1, providing an overview of the Chalcolithic period in the region and determining the transitional sequences from the Neolithic period.

Among many projects, salvage excavations at Aşvan Kale and Tille Höyük stand out.

In the field of epigraphy, French initiated a major project: the investigation of Asia Minor milestones, resulting in mapping of the ancient routes in Anatolia. The project took many years of fieldwork; French managed to record milestones and related inscriptions in all the Roman provinces of Anatolia west of the Euphrates. French published his first monograph on this project in 1981 and a two-volume preliminary catalogue in 1988.

He made significant contributions to the institute's scientific output until his death. Its library is now the David H. French Library.

David French: A Life in Anatolian Archaeology was published in 2020.

== Personal life ==
French was married to Elizabeth French (née Wace), a noted archaeologist of Mycenaean Greece, between the years 1959 and 1975. They had two daughters.

== Publications ==
=== Books ===
- French, D. H. 1966. Some problems in Macedonian prehistory. Thessalonikē: [Institute for Balkan Studies].
- French, D. H. 1969. Anatolia and the Aegean in the Third Millennium B.C. S.l: s.n.
- French, D. H., and Elizabeth B. French. 0019. Prehistoric pottery from the area of the agricultural prison at Tiryns. Mainz: Verlag Philipp von Zabern.
- Taylour, W. D. 1972. Excavations at Ayios Stephanos. [Oxford]: [University Press].
- French, D. H. 1972. Notes on prehistoric pottery groups from central Greece.
- International Colloquium on Aegean Prehistory, R. A. Crossland, and Ann Birchall. 1973. Bronze Age migrations in the Aegean; archaeological and linguistic problems in Greek prehistory. Proceedings of the first International Colloquium on Aegean Prehistory, Sheffield. [London]: Duckworth.
- Aulock, Hans von. 1976. Münzen und Städte Lykaoniens. Tübingen: Verlag Ernst Wasmuth
- French, D. H. 1981. Roman roads and milestones of Asia Minor 1, 1. Oxford: B.A.R.
- French, D. H. 1988. Roman roads and milestones of Asia Minor. Fasc. 2. Part 1-2, Fasc. 2. Part 1-2. Roman Roads and Milestones of Asia Minor. 1–2. Oxford: B.A.R.
- French, D. H., and C. S. Lightfoot. 1989. The Eastern frontier of the Roman Empire: proceedings of a colloquium held at Ankara in September 1988. Oxford: British Archaeological Reports.
- French, D. H., and Chris S. Lightfoot. 1989. The Eastern frontier of the Roman Empire: proceedings of a colloquium held at Ankara in September 1988. Part II Part II. Oxford:British Archaeological Reports.
- Anatolian Iron Ages Colloquium, Athan Çilingiroğlu, and D. H. French. 1991. Anatolian Iron Ages 2 the proceedings of the second Anatolian Iron Ages Colloquium held at İzmir, 4–8 May 1987. Oxford: Oxbow Books.
- Anatolian Iron Ages colloquium, Altan Atılgan C̜ilingiroğlu, and David French. 1994. Anatolian Iron Ages 3: the proceedings of the Third Anatolian Iron Ages colloquium held at Van, 6–12 August 1990. London: British Institute of archaeology at Ankara.
- French, David, and Alan Hall. 1994. Studies in the history and topography of Lycia and Pisidia: in memoriam A.S. Hall. Ankara: British Institute of Archaeology at Ankara.
- French, D. H. 1998. Canhasan I: stratigraphy and structures. London: British Institute of Archaeology at Ankara.
- French, D. H. 2003. Roman, Late Roman and Byzantine inscriptions of Ankara: a selection. Ankara: Museum of Anatolian civilizations.
- French, D. H. 2004. The inscriptions of Sinope. Bonn: Habelt
- French, D. H. 2005. Canhasan sites. 2, 2.
- French, D. H. 2010. Canhasan sites 3: Canhasan I : the small finds. London: British Institute of Ankara.
- Mitchell, Stephen, and David French. 2012. The Greek and Latin inscriptions of Ankara (Ancyra). Vol. I, Vol. I. München: C.H. Beck.
- Mitchell, Stephen, and D. H. French. 2019. The Greek and Latin inscriptions of Ankara (Ancyra). Vol. 2. Vol. 2. München: Verlag C.H. Beck.
- French, D.H. 2012: Roman Roads and Milestones of Asia Minor Vol. 3: Milestones, Fasc. 3.1: Republican (BIAA Electronic Monograph 1). London. ISBN 978-1-898249-24-5 | DOI:
- French, D. H. 2012: Roman Roads and Milestones of Asia Minor Vol. 3: Milestones, Fasc. 3.2: Galatia (BIAA Electronic Monograph 2). London. ISBN 978-1-898249-25-2 | DOI:
- French, D. H. 2012: Roman Roads and Milestones of Asia Minor Vol. 3: Milestones, Fasc. 3.3: Cappadocia (BIAA Electronic Monograph 3). London. ISBN 978-1-898249-26-9 | DOI:
- French, D. H. 2013: Roman Roads and Milestones of Asia Minor Vol. 3: Milestones, Fasc. 3.4: Pontus et Bithynia (with Northern Galatia) (BIAA Electronic Monograph 4). London. ISBN 978-1-898249-28-3 | DOI:
- French, D. H. 2014: Roman Roads and Milestones of Asia Minor Vol. 3: Milestones, Fasc. 3.5: Asia (BIAA Electronic Monograph 5). London. ISBN 978-1-898249-33-7 | DOI:
- French, D. H. 2014: Roman Roads and Milestones of Asia Minor Vol. 3: Milestones, Fasc. 3.6: Lycia et Pamphylia (BIAA Electronic Monograph 6). London. ISBN 978-1-898249-34-4 | DOI:
- French, D. H. 2014: Roman Roads and Milestones of Asia Minor Vol. 3: Milestones, Fasc. 3.7: Cilicia, Isauria et Lycaonia (and South-West Galatia) (BIAA Electronic Monograph 7). London. ISBN 978-1-898249-35-1 | DOI:
- French, D. H. 2015: Roman Roads and Milestones of Asia Minor Vol. 3: Milestones, Fasc. 3.8: Errata and Indices (BIAA Electronic Monograph 8). London. ISBN 978-1-898249-36-8 | DOI:
- French, D. H. 2015: Roman Roads and Milestones of Asia Minor Vol. 3: Milestones, Fasc. 3.9, An Album of Maps (BIAA Electronic Monograph 9). London. ISBN 978-0-9954656-0-2 | DOI:
- French, D. H. 2016: Roman Roads and Milestones of Asia Minor Vol. 4: The Roads, Fasc. 4.1: Notes on the Itineraria (BIAA Electronic Monograph 10). London. ISBN 978-0-9954656-1-9 | DOI:

=== Articles ===
- French, D. H. (January 1, 1961). Late Chalcolithic Pottery in North-West Turkey and the Aegean. Anatolian Studies, 11, 99-141
- French, D. H. (January 1, 1962). Excavations at Can Hasan: First Preliminary Report, 1961. Anatolian Studies, 12, 27–40.
- French, D. H. (December 1, 1963). Excavations at Can Hasan, Second Preliminary Report, 1962. Anatolian Studies, 13, 29–42.
- French, D. H. (January 1, 1964). Prehistoric pottery from Macedonia and Thrace. Praehistorische Zeitschrift, 42, 1, 30–48.
- French, D. H. (January 1, 1964). Excavations at Can Hasan Third Preliminary Report, 1963. Anatolian Studies, 14, 125–137.
- French, D. H. (January 1, 1965). Excavations at Can Hasan: Fourth Preliminary Report, 1964. Anatolian Studies, 15, 87–94.
- French, D. H. (January 1, 1965). Prehistoric Sites in the Goksu Valley. Anatolian Studies, 15, 177–201.
- French, D. H. (January 1, 1966). Excavations at Can Hasan, 1965: Fifth Preliminary Report. Anatolian Studies, 16, 113–123.
- French, D. H. (January 1, 1967). Excavations at Can Hasan, 1966: Sixth Preliminary Report. Anatolian Studies, 17, 165–178.
- French, D. H. (January 1, 1968). Excavations at Can Hasan, 1967: Seventh Preliminary Report. Anatolian Studies, 18, 45–53. | DOI: https://doi.org/10.2307/3642641
- French, D. H. (January 1, 1970). Notes on Site Distribution in the Cumra Area. Anatolian Studies, 20, 139–148. | DOI: https://doi.org/10.2307/3642592
- French, D. H. (January 1, 1971). An Experiment in Water-Sieving. Anatolian Studies, 21, 59–64. | DOI: https://doi.org/10.2307/3642629
- French, D. (January 1, 1972). A Sixteenth Century English Merchant in Ankara?. Anatolian Studies, 22, 241–247. | DOI: https://doi.org/10.2307/3642568
- French, D. H., Hillman, G. C., & Payne, S. (January 1, 1972). Excavations at Can Hasan III 1969–1970. Papers in Economic Prehistory, 1, 181–190.
- French, D. (January 1, 1973). Asvan 1968-72: The Excavations. Anatolian Studies, 23, 73–91. | DOI: https://doi.org/10.2307/3642530
- French, D. (December 1, 1973). Kurupinar. Anatolian Studies, 23, 93–95. | DOI: https://doi.org/10.2307/3642531
- French, D., & Helms, S. (January 1, 1973). Asvan Kale: The Third Millennium Pottery. Anatolian Studies, 23, 153–158. | DOI: https://doi.org/10.2307/3642535
- French, D. (January 1, 1973). Asvan Project. Anatolian Studies, 23, 191–196.
- French, D., & Wagstaff, M. (January 1, 1973). Asvan Excavations: Summary. Anatolian Studies, 23, 305–307. | DOI: https://doi.org/10.2307/3642548
- French, D. H. (December 1, 1974). A Study of Roman Roads in Anatolia: Principles and Methods. Anatolian Studies, 24, 143–149. | DOI: https://doi.org/10.2307/3642605
- French, D. (January 1, 1976). S. Quintilius Maximus, Proconsul (Of Asia). Zeitschrift Für Papyrologie Und Epigraphik, 21, 77–78.
