= Anatolian Studies =

- Discipline: Area studies
- Language: English

Publication details
- History: 1951–present
- Publisher: Cambridge University Press on behalf of the British Institute at Ankara
- Frequency: Annually

Standard abbreviations
- ISO 4: Anatol. Stud.

Indexing
- ISSN: 0066-1546 (print); 2048-0849 (web)

Links
- Journal homepage

Anatolian Studies is an annual peer-reviewed academic journal covering the history, archaeology, and social sciences of Anatolia and the Black Sea region. It was established in 1951 and is published by Cambridge University Press on behalf of the British Institute at Ankara.

== Abstracting and indexing ==
The journal is abstracted and indexed in:

- L'Année Philologique
