= British Institute at Ankara =

Education organization in Turkey with UK connection

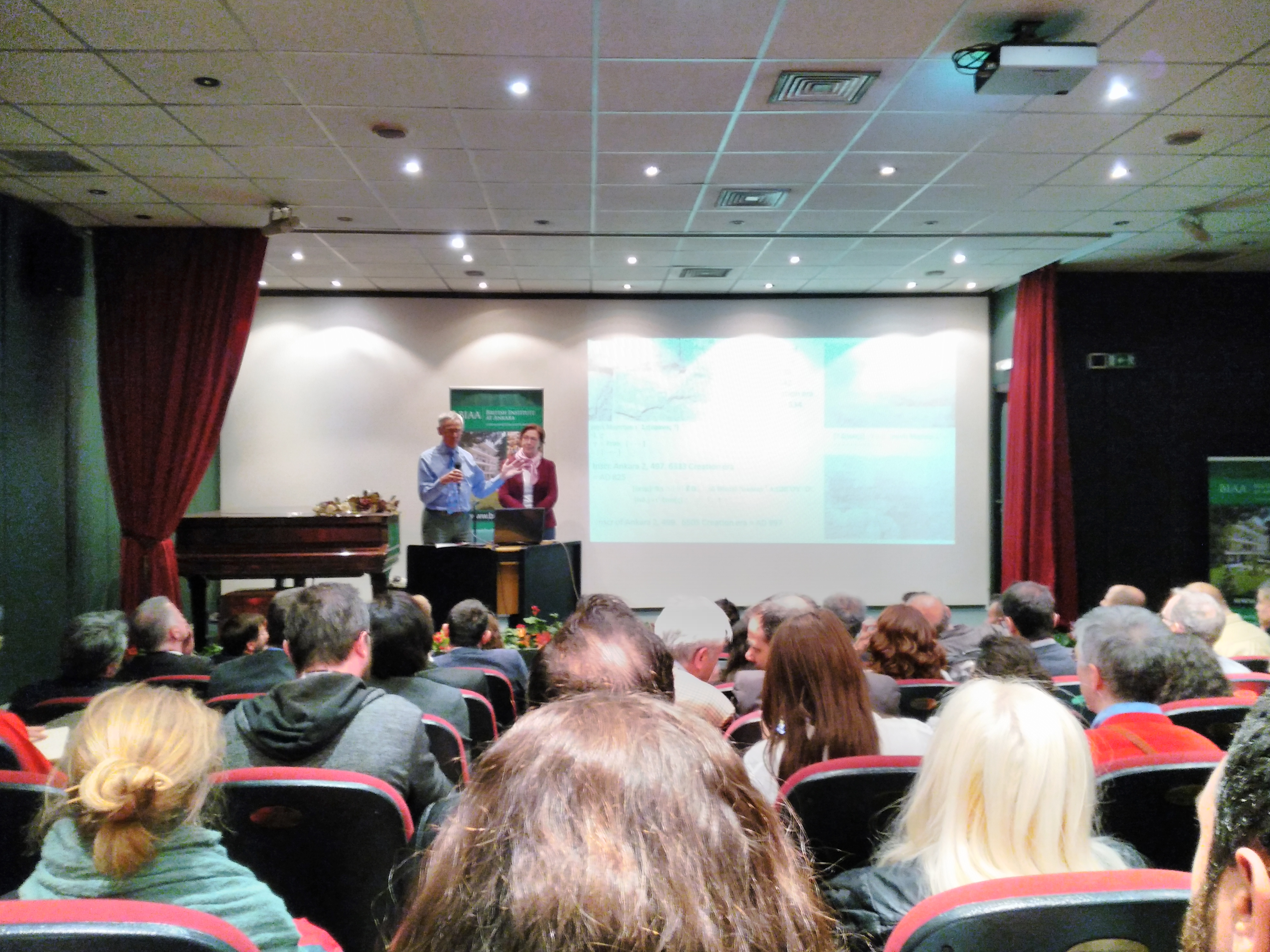
- Founder: John B. E. Garstang
- Established: 1947
- Focus: Archaeology
- Director: Lutgarde Vandeput
- Formerly called: British Institute of Archaeology at Ankara
- Address: Atatürk Bulvarı No: 154, Çankaya
- Location: Ankara, Turkey
- Coordinates: 39.898728°N 32.860617°E
- Interactive map of British Institute at Ankara
- Website: biaa.ac.uk

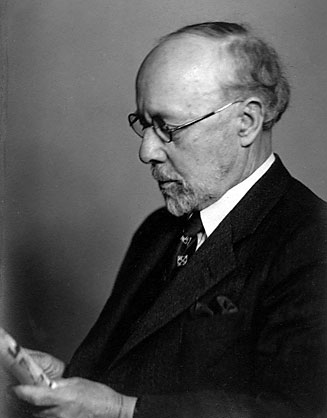
John B. E. Garstang, founder of the institute and its first director.

The British Institute at Ankara (BIAA), formerly British Institute of Archaeology at Ankara, is a research institute that supports, promotes, and publishes research into the humanities and social sciences of Turkey and the Black Sea region. The institute was founded in 1947 and became legally incorporated in 1956 as part of a cultural agreement between Turkey and the United Kingdom. The institute is a UK registered charity and one of the British Academy's International Research Institutes. The institute has an office based in Ankara, where it maintains a library, a digital repository office, research facilities, and accommodation for visiting scholars. It also has a London office.

Archaeologist Dr Lutgarde Vandeput is the current director of the BIAA.

In addition to funding the publication of research monographs on archaeology and the history of Turkey, the institute regularly publishes the journal Anatolian Studies and the annual magazine Heritage Türkiye.

By the decision of the Turkish government, all scholars from the United Kingdom wishing to do archaeological research in Turkey must channel their permit applications through the British Institute in Ankara.

== History ==
The BIAA was founded on 22 November 1947 after proposals by the British archaeologist John Garstang, who became the institute's first director. He was instrumental in choosing Ankara as the location of the new institute, in contrast to similar existing organizations that were based in Istanbul. Other founding members included the archaeologist and museum curator Winifred Lamb, who served as honorary secretary from the organisation's foundation until 1956, whereupon she became vice-president.

The institute's journal, Anatolian Studies, was first published in 1951, becoming a key reference for all archaeology-related disciplines in the region.

Seton Lloyd succeeded Garstang as director in 1949. In 1961, Michael Gough became the institute's third director. He had a focus on the Byzantine period, with excavations at the church complex at Alahan and at Dağ Pazarı. James Mellaart, as assistant director from 1957 to 1961, started excavations at the site of Çatalhöyük, identifying it as a unique Neolithic settlement. David French became the institute's fourth director in 1968. In 1993, French retired, and in 1995, Roger Matthews became the fifth director. Hugh Elton, who was appointed director in 2001, changed the name from the British Institute of Archaeology to the British Institute. The current director is Lutgarde Vandeput, who became director in 2006.

== Research ==
Focusing on Turkey and the Black Sea region as a crossroads and as a distinctive creative and cultural hub in both global and neighbourhood perspectives, the BIAA funds research that falls within its Strategic Research Initiatives (SRIs). These SRIs reflect current trends in the international and UK academic communities within the fields of Archaeology and Related Disciplines, Cultural Heritage Management, Digital Humanitie,s and Ottoman and Contemporary Turkish Studies.

=== Research Projects ===
The BIAA has been involved in over 100 projects of major academic and cultural significance since its foundation as a research institution more than seven decades ago. Throughout the years, BIAA researchers have engaged in archaeological excavations, surface surveys, epigraphic exploration, architectural studies, restoration projects and museum-based research, spanning a diverse range of topics, territories, disciplines and eras.

Since the early 2000s, as the role of the Institute has expanded to cover a wider range of research in the humanities and social sciences, the BIAA has also sponsored an increasing number of projects in the fields of Cultural Heritage Management, Ottoman and contemporary Turkish history, social anthropology, sociology and political science.

See past and current BIAA-led or funded project here.

See open calls for grants and opportunities here.

== Publications ==
The BIAA has a number of publication series: an annual peer-reviewed journal, Anatolian Studies, three monograph series, a range of open access electronic publications, and an annual magazine, Heritage Türkiye.

See all publications here.

== Events and Activities ==
=== Heritage Türkiye Podcast ===
Released every three to four weeks on Spotify, Apple Podcasts, and the BIAA YouTube channel (with Turkish subtitles), each episode features Assistant Directors Dr Işılay Gürsu and Dr Peter Cherry in conversation with researchers affiliated with the BIAA. The podcast series is intended to communicate the BIAA's research to a wider audience in an accessible format.

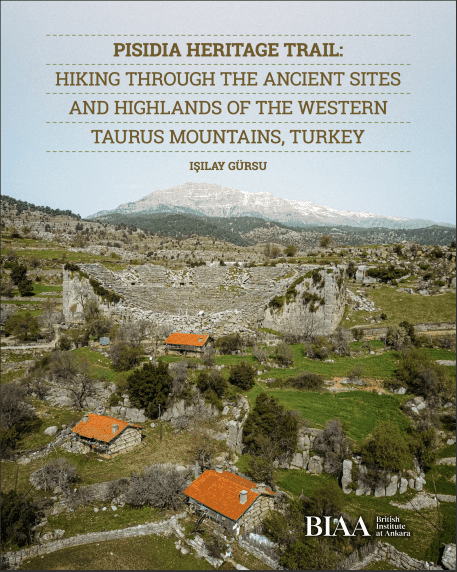
Pisidia Heritage Trail Guidebook

=== Pisidia Heritage Trail Tour ===
The Pisidia Heritage Trail (PHT) is a long-distance trekking trail, which is more than 350km long, connecting twelve different archaeological sites in the ancient region of Pisidia (southwest Turkey).

These archaeological sites, situated in remote, pristine and densely forested highlands, have the potential to offer a quasi-poetic experience for explorers. The route of the PHT follows the remnants of 2,000-year-old ancient roads and, where these ancient roads are no longer traceable, little paths that are still used by local villagers. The trail is designed to attract hikers, nature lovers and adventurers in general, and to provide economic benefits for the communities who live in the vicinity of these ruins.

The trail has already been waymarked with tailored made marks designed as Pisidian shield in red paint. The launch of a dedicated website and a guidebook is imminent.

In order to portray how the Pisidian cities looked in ancient times, Pisidia Heritage Trail Mobile App was prepared, which contains 3D reconstructions of selected monuments with accompanying explanatory texts. The app, designed by Lithodomos VR is available free on Android and iOS.

== Library and Collections ==
The Library was founded in 1948, one year after the establishment of the BIAA. In 2018, it was renamed in honour of the Institute’s former Director, David H. French. The library holds a rich collection of more than 65,000 resources, including books, journals, theses, maps, and audio-visual materials.

The library reflects the intellectual engagement of the BIAA since its foundation as an institute dedicated to archaeology in Turkey. Its collections span the full breadth of archaeological research, from the Bronze Age (3300–1200 BC) to the Byzantine period. These holdings have been significantly enriched by generous donations from David H. French, Stephen Mitchell, and similar scholars who have benefited from and contributed to the library’s resources.

Recently, the library began collecting for the Institute’s new initiatives of Cultural Heritage and Ottoman and Modern Turkish Studies. In 2007, the library received a British Academy grant to begin systematically developing collections of Ottoman and Modern Turkish Studies. This collection includes historical, architectural, political, and archival works, most prominently from the 19th century to the present.

Further details about the Library here.

Check the Collections here.

== Digital Repository ==
The BIAA Digital Repository is a platform for accessing, preserving, and sharing the Institute’s archives and research outputs. Established in 2018, the Digital Repository functions as a virtual open-access archive, digitalising the BIAA’s collections and research outputs since 1947, in accordance with FAIR (Findable, Accessible, Interoperable, Reusable) principles. As part of the BIAA’s ongoing commitment to supporting innovative scholarship in the humanities, our repository is central to our strategic research initiatives, with a emphasis on the stewardship of data and the advancement of digital humanities.

Further details about the Digital Repository here.

== Membership ==
The BIAA invites academics, students, researchers and anyone interested in Turkey and the Black Sea region to join us as a member. The annual subscription (discounted for students and the unwaged) entitles members to:

- receive copies of the annual peer-reviewed journal, Anatolian Studies, and the annual magazine, Heritage Türkiye, as well as our newsletters;
- use of the Institute’s facilities in Ankara including the guesthouse, research library of 65,000+ volumes, laboratories, computer services and extensive research and archival collections;
- a 20% discount on BIAA monographs published by Oxbow Books and back-issues 1-61 of Anatolian Studies;
- a 30% discount on books relating to Turkey published by I.B. Tauris;
- attend all BIAA lectures, events and receptions held in London or elsewhere in the UK;
- nominate candidates for and stand for election to the Institute’s Council;
- receive discounts on Turkish holidays organised by travel firms closely associated with the BIAA.

Check membership's details here.
